

86001–86100 

|-bgcolor=#d6d6d6
| 86001 ||  || — || May 12, 1999 || Socorro || LINEAR || ALA || align=right | 8.1 km || 
|-id=002 bgcolor=#E9E9E9
| 86002 ||  || — || May 12, 1999 || Socorro || LINEAR || EUN || align=right | 6.3 km || 
|-id=003 bgcolor=#E9E9E9
| 86003 ||  || — || May 12, 1999 || Socorro || LINEAR || — || align=right | 3.3 km || 
|-id=004 bgcolor=#E9E9E9
| 86004 ||  || — || May 12, 1999 || Socorro || LINEAR || EUN || align=right | 3.5 km || 
|-id=005 bgcolor=#E9E9E9
| 86005 ||  || — || May 12, 1999 || Socorro || LINEAR || — || align=right | 5.5 km || 
|-id=006 bgcolor=#E9E9E9
| 86006 ||  || — || May 12, 1999 || Socorro || LINEAR || — || align=right | 4.4 km || 
|-id=007 bgcolor=#E9E9E9
| 86007 ||  || — || May 12, 1999 || Socorro || LINEAR || — || align=right | 4.2 km || 
|-id=008 bgcolor=#E9E9E9
| 86008 ||  || — || May 12, 1999 || Socorro || LINEAR || — || align=right | 6.2 km || 
|-id=009 bgcolor=#E9E9E9
| 86009 ||  || — || May 12, 1999 || Socorro || LINEAR || CLO || align=right | 5.5 km || 
|-id=010 bgcolor=#E9E9E9
| 86010 ||  || — || May 12, 1999 || Socorro || LINEAR || — || align=right | 5.0 km || 
|-id=011 bgcolor=#E9E9E9
| 86011 ||  || — || May 12, 1999 || Socorro || LINEAR || — || align=right | 5.7 km || 
|-id=012 bgcolor=#E9E9E9
| 86012 ||  || — || May 12, 1999 || Socorro || LINEAR || EUN || align=right | 2.3 km || 
|-id=013 bgcolor=#E9E9E9
| 86013 ||  || — || May 12, 1999 || Socorro || LINEAR || — || align=right | 3.1 km || 
|-id=014 bgcolor=#E9E9E9
| 86014 ||  || — || May 12, 1999 || Socorro || LINEAR || — || align=right | 5.1 km || 
|-id=015 bgcolor=#E9E9E9
| 86015 ||  || — || May 12, 1999 || Socorro || LINEAR || EUN || align=right | 2.8 km || 
|-id=016 bgcolor=#E9E9E9
| 86016 ||  || — || May 12, 1999 || Socorro || LINEAR || MAR || align=right | 3.5 km || 
|-id=017 bgcolor=#E9E9E9
| 86017 ||  || — || May 12, 1999 || Socorro || LINEAR || HNS || align=right | 4.1 km || 
|-id=018 bgcolor=#fefefe
| 86018 ||  || — || May 13, 1999 || Socorro || LINEAR || — || align=right | 2.5 km || 
|-id=019 bgcolor=#fefefe
| 86019 ||  || — || May 13, 1999 || Socorro || LINEAR || V || align=right | 2.8 km || 
|-id=020 bgcolor=#E9E9E9
| 86020 ||  || — || May 12, 1999 || Socorro || LINEAR || — || align=right | 5.9 km || 
|-id=021 bgcolor=#E9E9E9
| 86021 ||  || — || May 20, 1999 || Socorro || LINEAR || — || align=right | 8.2 km || 
|-id=022 bgcolor=#d6d6d6
| 86022 ||  || — || May 18, 1999 || Socorro || LINEAR || — || align=right | 9.1 km || 
|-id=023 bgcolor=#d6d6d6
| 86023 ||  || — || May 22, 1999 || McGraw-Hill || J. W. Parker || HYG || align=right | 5.0 km || 
|-id=024 bgcolor=#E9E9E9
| 86024 ||  || — || June 7, 1999 || Socorro || LINEAR || — || align=right | 9.1 km || 
|-id=025 bgcolor=#FA8072
| 86025 ||  || — || June 9, 1999 || Socorro || LINEAR || — || align=right | 1.8 km || 
|-id=026 bgcolor=#d6d6d6
| 86026 ||  || — || June 7, 1999 || Kitt Peak || Spacewatch || ITH || align=right | 3.8 km || 
|-id=027 bgcolor=#E9E9E9
| 86027 ||  || — || June 9, 1999 || Socorro || LINEAR || — || align=right | 6.0 km || 
|-id=028 bgcolor=#d6d6d6
| 86028 ||  || — || June 9, 1999 || Socorro || LINEAR || — || align=right | 7.3 km || 
|-id=029 bgcolor=#E9E9E9
| 86029 ||  || — || June 8, 1999 || Catalina || CSS || — || align=right | 3.5 km || 
|-id=030 bgcolor=#fefefe
| 86030 ||  || — || July 12, 1999 || Socorro || LINEAR || H || align=right | 2.0 km || 
|-id=031 bgcolor=#fefefe
| 86031 ||  || — || July 13, 1999 || Socorro || LINEAR || H || align=right | 3.0 km || 
|-id=032 bgcolor=#E9E9E9
| 86032 ||  || — || July 13, 1999 || Socorro || LINEAR || — || align=right | 6.0 km || 
|-id=033 bgcolor=#E9E9E9
| 86033 ||  || — || July 13, 1999 || Socorro || LINEAR || — || align=right | 7.2 km || 
|-id=034 bgcolor=#E9E9E9
| 86034 ||  || — || July 13, 1999 || Socorro || LINEAR || — || align=right | 8.5 km || 
|-id=035 bgcolor=#fefefe
| 86035 ||  || — || July 14, 1999 || Socorro || LINEAR || H || align=right | 1.5 km || 
|-id=036 bgcolor=#d6d6d6
| 86036 ||  || — || July 14, 1999 || Socorro || LINEAR || — || align=right | 6.5 km || 
|-id=037 bgcolor=#E9E9E9
| 86037 ||  || — || July 14, 1999 || Socorro || LINEAR || MAR || align=right | 9.2 km || 
|-id=038 bgcolor=#d6d6d6
| 86038 ||  || — || July 14, 1999 || Socorro || LINEAR || EOS || align=right | 8.0 km || 
|-id=039 bgcolor=#FFC2E0
| 86039 ||  || — || July 14, 1999 || Socorro || LINEAR || APO +1kmPHA || align=right | 2.2 km || 
|-id=040 bgcolor=#E9E9E9
| 86040 ||  || — || July 13, 1999 || Socorro || LINEAR || DOR || align=right | 5.6 km || 
|-id=041 bgcolor=#d6d6d6
| 86041 ||  || — || July 12, 1999 || Socorro || LINEAR || ALA || align=right | 7.1 km || 
|-id=042 bgcolor=#E9E9E9
| 86042 ||  || — || July 12, 1999 || Socorro || LINEAR || — || align=right | 4.4 km || 
|-id=043 bgcolor=#d6d6d6
| 86043 Cévennes || 1999 OE ||  || July 16, 1999 || Pises || Pises Obs. || — || align=right | 6.4 km || 
|-id=044 bgcolor=#d6d6d6
| 86044 ||  || — || July 22, 1999 || Socorro || LINEAR || — || align=right | 7.7 km || 
|-id=045 bgcolor=#fefefe
| 86045 ||  || — || July 22, 1999 || Socorro || LINEAR || H || align=right | 2.4 km || 
|-id=046 bgcolor=#d6d6d6
| 86046 ||  || — || July 22, 1999 || Socorro || LINEAR || Tj (2.98) || align=right | 6.6 km || 
|-id=047 bgcolor=#C2E0FF
| 86047 ||  || — || July 18, 1999 || Mauna Kea || Mauna Kea Obs. || Haumea || align=right | 194 km || 
|-id=048 bgcolor=#d6d6d6
| 86048 ||  || — || August 9, 1999 || Ondřejov || P. Pravec, P. Kušnirák || EOS || align=right | 5.9 km || 
|-id=049 bgcolor=#d6d6d6
| 86049 ||  || — || August 13, 1999 || Reedy Creek || J. Broughton || — || align=right | 6.4 km || 
|-id=050 bgcolor=#d6d6d6
| 86050 ||  || — || August 12, 1999 || Anderson Mesa || LONEOS || — || align=right | 4.9 km || 
|-id=051 bgcolor=#E9E9E9
| 86051 ||  || — || August 22, 1999 || Črni Vrh || Črni Vrh || DOR || align=right | 9.4 km || 
|-id=052 bgcolor=#d6d6d6
| 86052 ||  || — || September 4, 1999 || Catalina || CSS || EOSfast? || align=right | 5.7 km || 
|-id=053 bgcolor=#d6d6d6
| 86053 ||  || — || September 3, 1999 || Kitt Peak || Spacewatch || EUP || align=right | 11 km || 
|-id=054 bgcolor=#d6d6d6
| 86054 ||  || — || September 7, 1999 || Socorro || LINEAR || — || align=right | 6.8 km || 
|-id=055 bgcolor=#d6d6d6
| 86055 ||  || — || September 7, 1999 || Socorro || LINEAR || EOS || align=right | 5.4 km || 
|-id=056 bgcolor=#d6d6d6
| 86056 ||  || — || September 7, 1999 || Socorro || LINEAR || — || align=right | 7.1 km || 
|-id=057 bgcolor=#d6d6d6
| 86057 ||  || — || September 7, 1999 || Socorro || LINEAR || — || align=right | 5.9 km || 
|-id=058 bgcolor=#d6d6d6
| 86058 ||  || — || September 7, 1999 || Socorro || LINEAR || ALA || align=right | 11 km || 
|-id=059 bgcolor=#E9E9E9
| 86059 ||  || — || September 7, 1999 || Socorro || LINEAR || — || align=right | 3.0 km || 
|-id=060 bgcolor=#d6d6d6
| 86060 ||  || — || September 7, 1999 || Socorro || LINEAR || — || align=right | 7.7 km || 
|-id=061 bgcolor=#d6d6d6
| 86061 ||  || — || September 7, 1999 || Socorro || LINEAR || — || align=right | 15 km || 
|-id=062 bgcolor=#d6d6d6
| 86062 ||  || — || September 7, 1999 || Socorro || LINEAR || EOS || align=right | 5.9 km || 
|-id=063 bgcolor=#d6d6d6
| 86063 ||  || — || September 7, 1999 || Socorro || LINEAR || YAK || align=right | 5.6 km || 
|-id=064 bgcolor=#d6d6d6
| 86064 ||  || — || September 7, 1999 || Socorro || LINEAR || HYG || align=right | 5.8 km || 
|-id=065 bgcolor=#d6d6d6
| 86065 ||  || — || September 7, 1999 || Višnjan Observatory || K. Korlević || — || align=right | 5.8 km || 
|-id=066 bgcolor=#d6d6d6
| 86066 ||  || — || September 8, 1999 || Višnjan Observatory || K. Korlević || — || align=right | 3.8 km || 
|-id=067 bgcolor=#FFC2E0
| 86067 ||  || — || September 3, 1999 || Siding Spring || R. H. McNaught || AMO +1km || align=right | 1.2 km || 
|-id=068 bgcolor=#fefefe
| 86068 ||  || — || September 8, 1999 || Socorro || LINEAR || H || align=right | 1.3 km || 
|-id=069 bgcolor=#d6d6d6
| 86069 ||  || — || September 9, 1999 || Višnjan Observatory || K. Korlević || — || align=right | 10 km || 
|-id=070 bgcolor=#d6d6d6
| 86070 ||  || — || September 15, 1999 || Višnjan Observatory || K. Korlević || HYG || align=right | 8.6 km || 
|-id=071 bgcolor=#fefefe
| 86071 ||  || — || September 8, 1999 || Uccle || T. Pauwels || — || align=right | 2.1 km || 
|-id=072 bgcolor=#d6d6d6
| 86072 ||  || — || September 12, 1999 || Úpice || L. Vyskočil || — || align=right | 5.5 km || 
|-id=073 bgcolor=#d6d6d6
| 86073 ||  || — || September 7, 1999 || Socorro || LINEAR || — || align=right | 4.2 km || 
|-id=074 bgcolor=#d6d6d6
| 86074 ||  || — || September 7, 1999 || Socorro || LINEAR || EOS || align=right | 5.2 km || 
|-id=075 bgcolor=#fefefe
| 86075 ||  || — || September 7, 1999 || Socorro || LINEAR || V || align=right | 1.7 km || 
|-id=076 bgcolor=#d6d6d6
| 86076 ||  || — || September 7, 1999 || Socorro || LINEAR || EOS || align=right | 3.3 km || 
|-id=077 bgcolor=#d6d6d6
| 86077 ||  || — || September 7, 1999 || Socorro || LINEAR || — || align=right | 3.9 km || 
|-id=078 bgcolor=#fefefe
| 86078 ||  || — || September 7, 1999 || Socorro || LINEAR || V || align=right | 1.6 km || 
|-id=079 bgcolor=#d6d6d6
| 86079 ||  || — || September 7, 1999 || Socorro || LINEAR || EOS || align=right | 3.4 km || 
|-id=080 bgcolor=#d6d6d6
| 86080 ||  || — || September 7, 1999 || Socorro || LINEAR || THM || align=right | 4.7 km || 
|-id=081 bgcolor=#d6d6d6
| 86081 ||  || — || September 7, 1999 || Socorro || LINEAR || — || align=right | 5.2 km || 
|-id=082 bgcolor=#d6d6d6
| 86082 ||  || — || September 7, 1999 || Socorro || LINEAR || BRA || align=right | 2.7 km || 
|-id=083 bgcolor=#d6d6d6
| 86083 ||  || — || September 7, 1999 || Socorro || LINEAR || — || align=right | 5.4 km || 
|-id=084 bgcolor=#d6d6d6
| 86084 ||  || — || September 7, 1999 || Socorro || LINEAR || — || align=right | 4.5 km || 
|-id=085 bgcolor=#d6d6d6
| 86085 ||  || — || September 7, 1999 || Socorro || LINEAR || EOS || align=right | 4.1 km || 
|-id=086 bgcolor=#d6d6d6
| 86086 ||  || — || September 7, 1999 || Socorro || LINEAR || EOS || align=right | 4.6 km || 
|-id=087 bgcolor=#d6d6d6
| 86087 ||  || — || September 7, 1999 || Socorro || LINEAR || — || align=right | 3.9 km || 
|-id=088 bgcolor=#d6d6d6
| 86088 ||  || — || September 7, 1999 || Socorro || LINEAR || HYG || align=right | 9.6 km || 
|-id=089 bgcolor=#d6d6d6
| 86089 ||  || — || September 7, 1999 || Socorro || LINEAR || EOS || align=right | 4.4 km || 
|-id=090 bgcolor=#d6d6d6
| 86090 ||  || — || September 7, 1999 || Socorro || LINEAR || — || align=right | 4.3 km || 
|-id=091 bgcolor=#d6d6d6
| 86091 ||  || — || September 7, 1999 || Socorro || LINEAR || — || align=right | 7.4 km || 
|-id=092 bgcolor=#d6d6d6
| 86092 ||  || — || September 7, 1999 || Socorro || LINEAR || — || align=right | 6.9 km || 
|-id=093 bgcolor=#d6d6d6
| 86093 ||  || — || September 7, 1999 || Socorro || LINEAR || — || align=right | 10 km || 
|-id=094 bgcolor=#d6d6d6
| 86094 ||  || — || September 8, 1999 || Socorro || LINEAR || — || align=right | 6.2 km || 
|-id=095 bgcolor=#d6d6d6
| 86095 ||  || — || September 8, 1999 || Socorro || LINEAR || URS || align=right | 14 km || 
|-id=096 bgcolor=#d6d6d6
| 86096 ||  || — || September 8, 1999 || Socorro || LINEAR || — || align=right | 8.2 km || 
|-id=097 bgcolor=#d6d6d6
| 86097 ||  || — || September 8, 1999 || Socorro || LINEAR || EOS || align=right | 5.9 km || 
|-id=098 bgcolor=#d6d6d6
| 86098 ||  || — || September 8, 1999 || Socorro || LINEAR || — || align=right | 8.7 km || 
|-id=099 bgcolor=#d6d6d6
| 86099 ||  || — || September 8, 1999 || Socorro || LINEAR || — || align=right | 4.9 km || 
|-id=100 bgcolor=#d6d6d6
| 86100 ||  || — || September 8, 1999 || Socorro || LINEAR || HYG || align=right | 5.2 km || 
|}

86101–86200 

|-bgcolor=#d6d6d6
| 86101 ||  || — || September 8, 1999 || Socorro || LINEAR || — || align=right | 11 km || 
|-id=102 bgcolor=#d6d6d6
| 86102 ||  || — || September 8, 1999 || Socorro || LINEAR || EOS || align=right | 5.4 km || 
|-id=103 bgcolor=#d6d6d6
| 86103 ||  || — || September 8, 1999 || Socorro || LINEAR || EOS || align=right | 5.1 km || 
|-id=104 bgcolor=#d6d6d6
| 86104 ||  || — || September 8, 1999 || Socorro || LINEAR || EOS || align=right | 5.4 km || 
|-id=105 bgcolor=#d6d6d6
| 86105 ||  || — || September 8, 1999 || Socorro || LINEAR || EOS || align=right | 5.0 km || 
|-id=106 bgcolor=#d6d6d6
| 86106 ||  || — || September 9, 1999 || Socorro || LINEAR || slow || align=right | 8.8 km || 
|-id=107 bgcolor=#d6d6d6
| 86107 ||  || — || September 9, 1999 || Socorro || LINEAR || — || align=right | 4.5 km || 
|-id=108 bgcolor=#d6d6d6
| 86108 ||  || — || September 9, 1999 || Socorro || LINEAR || — || align=right | 7.6 km || 
|-id=109 bgcolor=#d6d6d6
| 86109 ||  || — || September 9, 1999 || Socorro || LINEAR || EOS || align=right | 5.5 km || 
|-id=110 bgcolor=#d6d6d6
| 86110 ||  || — || September 9, 1999 || Socorro || LINEAR || EOS || align=right | 7.0 km || 
|-id=111 bgcolor=#d6d6d6
| 86111 ||  || — || September 9, 1999 || Socorro || LINEAR || EOS || align=right | 4.8 km || 
|-id=112 bgcolor=#d6d6d6
| 86112 ||  || — || September 9, 1999 || Socorro || LINEAR || NAE || align=right | 10 km || 
|-id=113 bgcolor=#d6d6d6
| 86113 ||  || — || September 9, 1999 || Socorro || LINEAR || — || align=right | 13 km || 
|-id=114 bgcolor=#d6d6d6
| 86114 ||  || — || September 9, 1999 || Socorro || LINEAR || — || align=right | 5.1 km || 
|-id=115 bgcolor=#d6d6d6
| 86115 ||  || — || September 9, 1999 || Socorro || LINEAR || EOS || align=right | 5.9 km || 
|-id=116 bgcolor=#d6d6d6
| 86116 ||  || — || September 9, 1999 || Socorro || LINEAR || — || align=right | 6.1 km || 
|-id=117 bgcolor=#d6d6d6
| 86117 ||  || — || September 9, 1999 || Socorro || LINEAR || — || align=right | 6.6 km || 
|-id=118 bgcolor=#E9E9E9
| 86118 ||  || — || September 9, 1999 || Socorro || LINEAR || — || align=right | 5.6 km || 
|-id=119 bgcolor=#d6d6d6
| 86119 ||  || — || September 9, 1999 || Socorro || LINEAR || — || align=right | 3.8 km || 
|-id=120 bgcolor=#d6d6d6
| 86120 ||  || — || September 9, 1999 || Socorro || LINEAR || — || align=right | 5.1 km || 
|-id=121 bgcolor=#d6d6d6
| 86121 ||  || — || September 9, 1999 || Socorro || LINEAR || — || align=right | 4.1 km || 
|-id=122 bgcolor=#d6d6d6
| 86122 ||  || — || September 9, 1999 || Socorro || LINEAR || EOS || align=right | 7.6 km || 
|-id=123 bgcolor=#d6d6d6
| 86123 ||  || — || September 9, 1999 || Socorro || LINEAR || EOS || align=right | 3.7 km || 
|-id=124 bgcolor=#d6d6d6
| 86124 ||  || — || September 9, 1999 || Socorro || LINEAR || EOS || align=right | 4.7 km || 
|-id=125 bgcolor=#d6d6d6
| 86125 ||  || — || September 9, 1999 || Socorro || LINEAR || EOS || align=right | 4.2 km || 
|-id=126 bgcolor=#d6d6d6
| 86126 ||  || — || September 9, 1999 || Socorro || LINEAR || — || align=right | 5.5 km || 
|-id=127 bgcolor=#d6d6d6
| 86127 ||  || — || September 9, 1999 || Socorro || LINEAR || — || align=right | 6.4 km || 
|-id=128 bgcolor=#d6d6d6
| 86128 ||  || — || September 9, 1999 || Socorro || LINEAR || EOSslow || align=right | 5.6 km || 
|-id=129 bgcolor=#d6d6d6
| 86129 ||  || — || September 9, 1999 || Socorro || LINEAR || EOS || align=right | 6.5 km || 
|-id=130 bgcolor=#d6d6d6
| 86130 ||  || — || September 9, 1999 || Socorro || LINEAR || EOS || align=right | 5.6 km || 
|-id=131 bgcolor=#d6d6d6
| 86131 ||  || — || September 9, 1999 || Socorro || LINEAR || — || align=right | 8.2 km || 
|-id=132 bgcolor=#d6d6d6
| 86132 ||  || — || September 9, 1999 || Socorro || LINEAR || — || align=right | 2.8 km || 
|-id=133 bgcolor=#d6d6d6
| 86133 ||  || — || September 9, 1999 || Socorro || LINEAR || — || align=right | 5.8 km || 
|-id=134 bgcolor=#d6d6d6
| 86134 ||  || — || September 9, 1999 || Socorro || LINEAR || — || align=right | 7.4 km || 
|-id=135 bgcolor=#d6d6d6
| 86135 ||  || — || September 9, 1999 || Socorro || LINEAR || — || align=right | 6.0 km || 
|-id=136 bgcolor=#d6d6d6
| 86136 ||  || — || September 9, 1999 || Socorro || LINEAR || — || align=right | 5.0 km || 
|-id=137 bgcolor=#d6d6d6
| 86137 ||  || — || September 9, 1999 || Socorro || LINEAR || THM || align=right | 5.0 km || 
|-id=138 bgcolor=#d6d6d6
| 86138 ||  || — || September 9, 1999 || Socorro || LINEAR || — || align=right | 7.7 km || 
|-id=139 bgcolor=#d6d6d6
| 86139 ||  || — || September 9, 1999 || Socorro || LINEAR || HYG || align=right | 5.4 km || 
|-id=140 bgcolor=#d6d6d6
| 86140 ||  || — || September 9, 1999 || Socorro || LINEAR || ALA || align=right | 15 km || 
|-id=141 bgcolor=#d6d6d6
| 86141 ||  || — || September 9, 1999 || Socorro || LINEAR || ALA || align=right | 11 km || 
|-id=142 bgcolor=#d6d6d6
| 86142 ||  || — || September 9, 1999 || Socorro || LINEAR || — || align=right | 8.7 km || 
|-id=143 bgcolor=#d6d6d6
| 86143 ||  || — || September 9, 1999 || Socorro || LINEAR || — || align=right | 4.6 km || 
|-id=144 bgcolor=#d6d6d6
| 86144 ||  || — || September 11, 1999 || Socorro || LINEAR || EOS || align=right | 4.2 km || 
|-id=145 bgcolor=#d6d6d6
| 86145 ||  || — || September 11, 1999 || Socorro || LINEAR || — || align=right | 6.0 km || 
|-id=146 bgcolor=#d6d6d6
| 86146 ||  || — || September 7, 1999 || Socorro || LINEAR || HYG || align=right | 7.3 km || 
|-id=147 bgcolor=#E9E9E9
| 86147 ||  || — || September 8, 1999 || Socorro || LINEAR || — || align=right | 3.5 km || 
|-id=148 bgcolor=#d6d6d6
| 86148 ||  || — || September 8, 1999 || Socorro || LINEAR || EOS || align=right | 4.9 km || 
|-id=149 bgcolor=#d6d6d6
| 86149 ||  || — || September 10, 1999 || Socorro || LINEAR || ALA || align=right | 7.6 km || 
|-id=150 bgcolor=#d6d6d6
| 86150 ||  || — || September 8, 1999 || Socorro || LINEAR || — || align=right | 7.1 km || 
|-id=151 bgcolor=#d6d6d6
| 86151 ||  || — || September 8, 1999 || Socorro || LINEAR || — || align=right | 6.2 km || 
|-id=152 bgcolor=#d6d6d6
| 86152 ||  || — || September 8, 1999 || Socorro || LINEAR || URS || align=right | 8.9 km || 
|-id=153 bgcolor=#d6d6d6
| 86153 ||  || — || September 8, 1999 || Socorro || LINEAR || — || align=right | 12 km || 
|-id=154 bgcolor=#d6d6d6
| 86154 ||  || — || September 8, 1999 || Socorro || LINEAR || — || align=right | 7.3 km || 
|-id=155 bgcolor=#d6d6d6
| 86155 ||  || — || September 8, 1999 || Socorro || LINEAR || MEL || align=right | 9.2 km || 
|-id=156 bgcolor=#d6d6d6
| 86156 ||  || — || September 8, 1999 || Socorro || LINEAR || — || align=right | 11 km || 
|-id=157 bgcolor=#d6d6d6
| 86157 ||  || — || September 8, 1999 || Socorro || LINEAR || — || align=right | 7.0 km || 
|-id=158 bgcolor=#d6d6d6
| 86158 ||  || — || September 8, 1999 || Socorro || LINEAR || — || align=right | 7.5 km || 
|-id=159 bgcolor=#d6d6d6
| 86159 ||  || — || September 8, 1999 || Socorro || LINEAR || — || align=right | 7.3 km || 
|-id=160 bgcolor=#d6d6d6
| 86160 ||  || — || September 8, 1999 || Socorro || LINEAR || — || align=right | 5.6 km || 
|-id=161 bgcolor=#d6d6d6
| 86161 ||  || — || September 8, 1999 || Socorro || LINEAR || — || align=right | 9.5 km || 
|-id=162 bgcolor=#d6d6d6
| 86162 ||  || — || September 8, 1999 || Socorro || LINEAR || — || align=right | 11 km || 
|-id=163 bgcolor=#d6d6d6
| 86163 ||  || — || September 8, 1999 || Socorro || LINEAR || EOS || align=right | 7.9 km || 
|-id=164 bgcolor=#d6d6d6
| 86164 ||  || — || September 8, 1999 || Socorro || LINEAR || VER || align=right | 7.0 km || 
|-id=165 bgcolor=#d6d6d6
| 86165 ||  || — || September 8, 1999 || Socorro || LINEAR || EOS || align=right | 4.5 km || 
|-id=166 bgcolor=#d6d6d6
| 86166 ||  || — || September 8, 1999 || Socorro || LINEAR || — || align=right | 4.0 km || 
|-id=167 bgcolor=#d6d6d6
| 86167 ||  || — || September 8, 1999 || Socorro || LINEAR || — || align=right | 6.4 km || 
|-id=168 bgcolor=#d6d6d6
| 86168 ||  || — || September 8, 1999 || Socorro || LINEAR || EOS || align=right | 7.8 km || 
|-id=169 bgcolor=#d6d6d6
| 86169 ||  || — || September 8, 1999 || Socorro || LINEAR || — || align=right | 3.7 km || 
|-id=170 bgcolor=#d6d6d6
| 86170 ||  || — || September 8, 1999 || Socorro || LINEAR || EOS || align=right | 6.3 km || 
|-id=171 bgcolor=#d6d6d6
| 86171 ||  || — || September 8, 1999 || Socorro || LINEAR || EUP || align=right | 10 km || 
|-id=172 bgcolor=#d6d6d6
| 86172 ||  || — || September 8, 1999 || Socorro || LINEAR || EOS || align=right | 5.1 km || 
|-id=173 bgcolor=#d6d6d6
| 86173 ||  || — || September 8, 1999 || Socorro || LINEAR || EOS || align=right | 4.2 km || 
|-id=174 bgcolor=#d6d6d6
| 86174 ||  || — || September 8, 1999 || Socorro || LINEAR || — || align=right | 5.0 km || 
|-id=175 bgcolor=#d6d6d6
| 86175 ||  || — || September 10, 1999 || Socorro || LINEAR || — || align=right | 6.3 km || 
|-id=176 bgcolor=#d6d6d6
| 86176 ||  || — || September 5, 1999 || Anderson Mesa || LONEOS || — || align=right | 11 km || 
|-id=177 bgcolor=#C2E0FF
| 86177 ||  || — || September 8, 1999 || Mauna Kea || Mauna Kea Obs. || other TNO || align=right | 176 km || 
|-id=178 bgcolor=#d6d6d6
| 86178 ||  || — || September 4, 1999 || Catalina || CSS || — || align=right | 4.6 km || 
|-id=179 bgcolor=#d6d6d6
| 86179 ||  || — || September 5, 1999 || Catalina || CSS || — || align=right | 6.6 km || 
|-id=180 bgcolor=#d6d6d6
| 86180 ||  || — || September 5, 1999 || Anderson Mesa || LONEOS || — || align=right | 6.6 km || 
|-id=181 bgcolor=#d6d6d6
| 86181 ||  || — || September 7, 1999 || Catalina || CSS || EOS || align=right | 6.0 km || 
|-id=182 bgcolor=#d6d6d6
| 86182 ||  || — || September 7, 1999 || Catalina || CSS || — || align=right | 9.1 km || 
|-id=183 bgcolor=#d6d6d6
| 86183 ||  || — || September 7, 1999 || Catalina || CSS || EOS || align=right | 4.3 km || 
|-id=184 bgcolor=#d6d6d6
| 86184 ||  || — || September 8, 1999 || Catalina || CSS || — || align=right | 6.3 km || 
|-id=185 bgcolor=#d6d6d6
| 86185 ||  || — || September 8, 1999 || Catalina || CSS || — || align=right | 11 km || 
|-id=186 bgcolor=#d6d6d6
| 86186 ||  || — || September 8, 1999 || Catalina || CSS || EOS || align=right | 4.6 km || 
|-id=187 bgcolor=#d6d6d6
| 86187 ||  || — || September 8, 1999 || Anderson Mesa || LONEOS || — || align=right | 7.2 km || 
|-id=188 bgcolor=#d6d6d6
| 86188 ||  || — || September 14, 1999 || Catalina || CSS || HYG || align=right | 5.6 km || 
|-id=189 bgcolor=#d6d6d6
| 86189 ||  || — || September 4, 1999 || Catalina || CSS || — || align=right | 5.3 km || 
|-id=190 bgcolor=#d6d6d6
| 86190 ||  || — || September 5, 1999 || Anderson Mesa || LONEOS || — || align=right | 4.2 km || 
|-id=191 bgcolor=#d6d6d6
| 86191 ||  || — || September 6, 1999 || Catalina || CSS || ALA || align=right | 6.6 km || 
|-id=192 bgcolor=#fefefe
| 86192 ||  || — || September 18, 1999 || Socorro || LINEAR || H || align=right | 2.0 km || 
|-id=193 bgcolor=#fefefe
| 86193 ||  || — || September 18, 1999 || Socorro || LINEAR || H || align=right | 1.3 km || 
|-id=194 bgcolor=#FA8072
| 86194 ||  || — || September 18, 1999 || Socorro || LINEAR || H || align=right | 2.7 km || 
|-id=195 bgcolor=#d6d6d6
| 86195 ||  || — || September 30, 1999 || San Marcello || L. Tesi, G. Forti || — || align=right | 6.8 km || 
|-id=196 bgcolor=#d6d6d6
| 86196 Specula ||  ||  || September 24, 1999 || Piszkéstető || K. Sárneczky, L. Kiss || TIR || align=right | 3.0 km || 
|-id=197 bgcolor=#d6d6d6
| 86197 ||  || — || September 30, 1999 || Catalina || CSS || EOS || align=right | 4.0 km || 
|-id=198 bgcolor=#d6d6d6
| 86198 ||  || — || September 29, 1999 || Catalina || CSS || — || align=right | 5.7 km || 
|-id=199 bgcolor=#d6d6d6
| 86199 ||  || — || September 30, 1999 || Catalina || CSS || — || align=right | 7.0 km || 
|-id=200 bgcolor=#d6d6d6
| 86200 ||  || — || September 30, 1999 || Catalina || CSS || LIX || align=right | 7.8 km || 
|}

86201–86300 

|-bgcolor=#d6d6d6
| 86201 ||  || — || October 1, 1999 || Višnjan Observatory || K. Korlević || — || align=right | 6.5 km || 
|-id=202 bgcolor=#d6d6d6
| 86202 ||  || — || October 1, 1999 || Višnjan Observatory || K. Korlević || LIX || align=right | 11 km || 
|-id=203 bgcolor=#d6d6d6
| 86203 ||  || — || October 2, 1999 || Fountain Hills || C. W. Juels || — || align=right | 5.3 km || 
|-id=204 bgcolor=#d6d6d6
| 86204 ||  || — || October 2, 1999 || Fountain Hills || C. W. Juels || — || align=right | 7.2 km || 
|-id=205 bgcolor=#d6d6d6
| 86205 ||  || — || October 4, 1999 || Prescott || P. G. Comba || — || align=right | 9.0 km || 
|-id=206 bgcolor=#d6d6d6
| 86206 ||  || — || October 7, 1999 || Višnjan Observatory || K. Korlević, M. Jurić || slow || align=right | 6.5 km || 
|-id=207 bgcolor=#d6d6d6
| 86207 ||  || — || October 7, 1999 || Višnjan Observatory || K. Korlević, M. Jurić || — || align=right | 5.1 km || 
|-id=208 bgcolor=#d6d6d6
| 86208 ||  || — || October 11, 1999 || Črni Vrh || Črni Vrh || — || align=right | 9.6 km || 
|-id=209 bgcolor=#d6d6d6
| 86209 ||  || — || October 7, 1999 || Giesing Obs. || P. Sala || — || align=right | 6.8 km || 
|-id=210 bgcolor=#d6d6d6
| 86210 ||  || — || October 7, 1999 || Goodricke-Pigott || R. A. Tucker || — || align=right | 5.2 km || 
|-id=211 bgcolor=#d6d6d6
| 86211 ||  || — || October 7, 1999 || Goodricke-Pigott || R. A. Tucker || HYG || align=right | 5.1 km || 
|-id=212 bgcolor=#FA8072
| 86212 ||  || — || October 3, 1999 || Socorro || LINEAR || — || align=right | 2.6 km || 
|-id=213 bgcolor=#d6d6d6
| 86213 ||  || — || October 2, 1999 || Socorro || LINEAR || — || align=right | 5.5 km || 
|-id=214 bgcolor=#d6d6d6
| 86214 ||  || — || October 4, 1999 || Socorro || LINEAR || — || align=right | 8.9 km || 
|-id=215 bgcolor=#d6d6d6
| 86215 ||  || — || October 4, 1999 || Socorro || LINEAR || — || align=right | 7.5 km || 
|-id=216 bgcolor=#d6d6d6
| 86216 ||  || — || October 4, 1999 || Socorro || LINEAR || EOS || align=right | 4.2 km || 
|-id=217 bgcolor=#fefefe
| 86217 ||  || — || October 3, 1999 || Socorro || LINEAR || H || align=right | 1.8 km || 
|-id=218 bgcolor=#d6d6d6
| 86218 ||  || — || October 13, 1999 || Anderson Mesa || LONEOS || EOS || align=right | 4.8 km || 
|-id=219 bgcolor=#d6d6d6
| 86219 ||  || — || October 1, 1999 || Catalina || CSS || — || align=right | 7.4 km || 
|-id=220 bgcolor=#d6d6d6
| 86220 ||  || — || October 7, 1999 || Kitt Peak || Spacewatch || — || align=right | 4.9 km || 
|-id=221 bgcolor=#d6d6d6
| 86221 ||  || — || October 8, 1999 || Kitt Peak || Spacewatch || — || align=right | 5.0 km || 
|-id=222 bgcolor=#d6d6d6
| 86222 ||  || — || October 14, 1999 || Kitt Peak || Spacewatch || — || align=right | 4.5 km || 
|-id=223 bgcolor=#d6d6d6
| 86223 ||  || — || October 2, 1999 || Socorro || LINEAR || EOS || align=right | 4.4 km || 
|-id=224 bgcolor=#d6d6d6
| 86224 ||  || — || October 2, 1999 || Socorro || LINEAR || — || align=right | 6.7 km || 
|-id=225 bgcolor=#d6d6d6
| 86225 ||  || — || October 2, 1999 || Socorro || LINEAR || — || align=right | 4.8 km || 
|-id=226 bgcolor=#d6d6d6
| 86226 ||  || — || October 2, 1999 || Socorro || LINEAR || EOS || align=right | 5.6 km || 
|-id=227 bgcolor=#d6d6d6
| 86227 ||  || — || October 2, 1999 || Socorro || LINEAR || — || align=right | 5.8 km || 
|-id=228 bgcolor=#d6d6d6
| 86228 ||  || — || October 4, 1999 || Socorro || LINEAR || EOS || align=right | 4.8 km || 
|-id=229 bgcolor=#d6d6d6
| 86229 ||  || — || October 4, 1999 || Socorro || LINEAR || — || align=right | 9.3 km || 
|-id=230 bgcolor=#d6d6d6
| 86230 ||  || — || October 4, 1999 || Socorro || LINEAR || — || align=right | 11 km || 
|-id=231 bgcolor=#d6d6d6
| 86231 ||  || — || October 4, 1999 || Socorro || LINEAR || TEL || align=right | 4.7 km || 
|-id=232 bgcolor=#d6d6d6
| 86232 ||  || — || October 4, 1999 || Socorro || LINEAR || EMA || align=right | 11 km || 
|-id=233 bgcolor=#d6d6d6
| 86233 ||  || — || October 4, 1999 || Socorro || LINEAR || — || align=right | 6.5 km || 
|-id=234 bgcolor=#d6d6d6
| 86234 ||  || — || October 4, 1999 || Socorro || LINEAR || HYG || align=right | 8.8 km || 
|-id=235 bgcolor=#d6d6d6
| 86235 ||  || — || October 4, 1999 || Socorro || LINEAR || HYG || align=right | 7.0 km || 
|-id=236 bgcolor=#d6d6d6
| 86236 ||  || — || October 4, 1999 || Socorro || LINEAR || HYG || align=right | 7.4 km || 
|-id=237 bgcolor=#d6d6d6
| 86237 ||  || — || October 4, 1999 || Socorro || LINEAR || THM || align=right | 4.3 km || 
|-id=238 bgcolor=#d6d6d6
| 86238 ||  || — || October 4, 1999 || Socorro || LINEAR || NAE || align=right | 14 km || 
|-id=239 bgcolor=#d6d6d6
| 86239 ||  || — || October 4, 1999 || Socorro || LINEAR || — || align=right | 6.4 km || 
|-id=240 bgcolor=#d6d6d6
| 86240 ||  || — || October 4, 1999 || Socorro || LINEAR || HYG || align=right | 7.5 km || 
|-id=241 bgcolor=#d6d6d6
| 86241 ||  || — || October 4, 1999 || Socorro || LINEAR || EOS || align=right | 6.4 km || 
|-id=242 bgcolor=#d6d6d6
| 86242 ||  || — || October 4, 1999 || Socorro || LINEAR || HYG || align=right | 5.6 km || 
|-id=243 bgcolor=#d6d6d6
| 86243 ||  || — || October 6, 1999 || Socorro || LINEAR || — || align=right | 7.0 km || 
|-id=244 bgcolor=#d6d6d6
| 86244 ||  || — || October 6, 1999 || Socorro || LINEAR || — || align=right | 3.9 km || 
|-id=245 bgcolor=#d6d6d6
| 86245 ||  || — || October 7, 1999 || Socorro || LINEAR || URS || align=right | 8.2 km || 
|-id=246 bgcolor=#d6d6d6
| 86246 ||  || — || October 7, 1999 || Socorro || LINEAR || — || align=right | 7.8 km || 
|-id=247 bgcolor=#d6d6d6
| 86247 ||  || — || October 7, 1999 || Socorro || LINEAR || HYG || align=right | 7.8 km || 
|-id=248 bgcolor=#d6d6d6
| 86248 ||  || — || October 7, 1999 || Socorro || LINEAR || HYG || align=right | 6.8 km || 
|-id=249 bgcolor=#d6d6d6
| 86249 ||  || — || October 9, 1999 || Socorro || LINEAR || — || align=right | 4.1 km || 
|-id=250 bgcolor=#d6d6d6
| 86250 ||  || — || October 10, 1999 || Socorro || LINEAR || — || align=right | 7.7 km || 
|-id=251 bgcolor=#d6d6d6
| 86251 ||  || — || October 11, 1999 || Socorro || LINEAR || HYG || align=right | 5.8 km || 
|-id=252 bgcolor=#d6d6d6
| 86252 ||  || — || October 12, 1999 || Socorro || LINEAR || — || align=right | 8.2 km || 
|-id=253 bgcolor=#d6d6d6
| 86253 ||  || — || October 12, 1999 || Socorro || LINEAR || ALA || align=right | 9.3 km || 
|-id=254 bgcolor=#d6d6d6
| 86254 ||  || — || October 12, 1999 || Socorro || LINEAR || — || align=right | 6.3 km || 
|-id=255 bgcolor=#d6d6d6
| 86255 ||  || — || October 12, 1999 || Socorro || LINEAR || — || align=right | 9.8 km || 
|-id=256 bgcolor=#d6d6d6
| 86256 ||  || — || October 12, 1999 || Socorro || LINEAR || — || align=right | 7.2 km || 
|-id=257 bgcolor=#fefefe
| 86257 ||  || — || October 14, 1999 || Socorro || LINEAR || H || align=right | 2.3 km || 
|-id=258 bgcolor=#d6d6d6
| 86258 ||  || — || October 14, 1999 || Socorro || LINEAR || — || align=right | 6.0 km || 
|-id=259 bgcolor=#d6d6d6
| 86259 ||  || — || October 4, 1999 || Socorro || LINEAR || EOS || align=right | 5.9 km || 
|-id=260 bgcolor=#d6d6d6
| 86260 ||  || — || October 5, 1999 || Catalina || CSS || TIR || align=right | 4.4 km || 
|-id=261 bgcolor=#d6d6d6
| 86261 ||  || — || October 3, 1999 || Socorro || LINEAR || EOS || align=right | 6.0 km || 
|-id=262 bgcolor=#d6d6d6
| 86262 ||  || — || October 3, 1999 || Catalina || CSS || HYG || align=right | 6.2 km || 
|-id=263 bgcolor=#fefefe
| 86263 ||  || — || October 12, 1999 || Socorro || LINEAR || H || align=right | 1.4 km || 
|-id=264 bgcolor=#d6d6d6
| 86264 ||  || — || October 9, 1999 || Catalina || CSS || LIX || align=right | 7.8 km || 
|-id=265 bgcolor=#d6d6d6
| 86265 ||  || — || October 9, 1999 || Catalina || CSS || — || align=right | 7.7 km || 
|-id=266 bgcolor=#d6d6d6
| 86266 ||  || — || October 9, 1999 || Kitt Peak || Spacewatch || EMA || align=right | 5.7 km || 
|-id=267 bgcolor=#d6d6d6
| 86267 ||  || — || October 9, 1999 || Socorro || LINEAR || THM || align=right | 5.2 km || 
|-id=268 bgcolor=#d6d6d6
| 86268 ||  || — || October 3, 1999 || Socorro || LINEAR || VER || align=right | 5.9 km || 
|-id=269 bgcolor=#d6d6d6
| 86269 ||  || — || October 3, 1999 || Socorro || LINEAR || ALA || align=right | 10 km || 
|-id=270 bgcolor=#d6d6d6
| 86270 ||  || — || October 7, 1999 || Socorro || LINEAR || THM || align=right | 7.0 km || 
|-id=271 bgcolor=#E9E9E9
| 86271 ||  || — || October 8, 1999 || Socorro || LINEAR || — || align=right | 5.8 km || 
|-id=272 bgcolor=#d6d6d6
| 86272 ||  || — || October 10, 1999 || Socorro || LINEAR || — || align=right | 8.2 km || 
|-id=273 bgcolor=#d6d6d6
| 86273 ||  || — || October 12, 1999 || Socorro || LINEAR || — || align=right | 8.7 km || 
|-id=274 bgcolor=#d6d6d6
| 86274 ||  || — || October 3, 1999 || Anderson Mesa || LONEOS || — || align=right | 5.3 km || 
|-id=275 bgcolor=#d6d6d6
| 86275 ||  || — || October 10, 1999 || Socorro || LINEAR || 7:4 || align=right | 8.1 km || 
|-id=276 bgcolor=#d6d6d6
| 86276 ||  || — || October 3, 1999 || Catalina || CSS || — || align=right | 4.2 km || 
|-id=277 bgcolor=#d6d6d6
| 86277 ||  || — || October 14, 1999 || Socorro || LINEAR || — || align=right | 8.9 km || 
|-id=278 bgcolor=#d6d6d6
| 86278 || 1999 UN || — || October 16, 1999 || Višnjan Observatory || K. Korlević || — || align=right | 4.7 km || 
|-id=279 bgcolor=#fefefe
| 86279 Brucegary ||  ||  || October 17, 1999 || Junk Bond || J. Medkeff || H || align=right | 1.6 km || 
|-id=280 bgcolor=#fefefe
| 86280 ||  || — || October 31, 1999 || Socorro || LINEAR || H || align=right | 2.5 km || 
|-id=281 bgcolor=#d6d6d6
| 86281 ||  || — || October 31, 1999 || Socorro || LINEAR || ALA || align=right | 16 km || 
|-id=282 bgcolor=#d6d6d6
| 86282 ||  || — || October 29, 1999 || Catalina || CSS || TEL || align=right | 3.1 km || 
|-id=283 bgcolor=#d6d6d6
| 86283 ||  || — || October 28, 1999 || Catalina || CSS || — || align=right | 7.8 km || 
|-id=284 bgcolor=#fefefe
| 86284 ||  || — || October 30, 1999 || Kitt Peak || Spacewatch || — || align=right | 2.2 km || 
|-id=285 bgcolor=#d6d6d6
| 86285 ||  || — || October 31, 1999 || Kitt Peak || Spacewatch || VER || align=right | 9.1 km || 
|-id=286 bgcolor=#d6d6d6
| 86286 ||  || — || October 28, 1999 || Catalina || CSS || — || align=right | 3.7 km || 
|-id=287 bgcolor=#d6d6d6
| 86287 ||  || — || October 30, 1999 || Anderson Mesa || LONEOS || — || align=right | 12 km || 
|-id=288 bgcolor=#d6d6d6
| 86288 ||  || — || October 31, 1999 || Catalina || CSS || — || align=right | 12 km || 
|-id=289 bgcolor=#d6d6d6
| 86289 ||  || — || October 31, 1999 || Anderson Mesa || LONEOS || — || align=right | 6.5 km || 
|-id=290 bgcolor=#d6d6d6
| 86290 ||  || — || October 29, 1999 || Catalina || CSS || HYG || align=right | 6.0 km || 
|-id=291 bgcolor=#d6d6d6
| 86291 ||  || — || October 30, 1999 || Catalina || CSS || — || align=right | 7.9 km || 
|-id=292 bgcolor=#d6d6d6
| 86292 ||  || — || November 10, 1999 || Fountain Hills || C. W. Juels || — || align=right | 7.8 km || 
|-id=293 bgcolor=#d6d6d6
| 86293 ||  || — || November 1, 1999 || Socorro || LINEAR || — || align=right | 8.5 km || 
|-id=294 bgcolor=#fefefe
| 86294 ||  || — || November 2, 1999 || Socorro || LINEAR || H || align=right | 1.6 km || 
|-id=295 bgcolor=#d6d6d6
| 86295 ||  || — || November 2, 1999 || Kitt Peak || Spacewatch || — || align=right | 5.3 km || 
|-id=296 bgcolor=#fefefe
| 86296 ||  || — || November 9, 1999 || Dynic || A. Sugie || H || align=right | 1.5 km || 
|-id=297 bgcolor=#d6d6d6
| 86297 ||  || — || November 12, 1999 || Višnjan Observatory || K. Korlević || — || align=right | 12 km || 
|-id=298 bgcolor=#d6d6d6
| 86298 ||  || — || November 13, 1999 || Fountain Hills || C. W. Juels || — || align=right | 4.6 km || 
|-id=299 bgcolor=#fefefe
| 86299 ||  || — || November 3, 1999 || Socorro || LINEAR || — || align=right | 2.3 km || 
|-id=300 bgcolor=#d6d6d6
| 86300 ||  || — || November 3, 1999 || Socorro || LINEAR || — || align=right | 6.0 km || 
|}

86301–86400 

|-bgcolor=#d6d6d6
| 86301 ||  || — || November 1, 1999 || Catalina || CSS || — || align=right | 4.9 km || 
|-id=302 bgcolor=#fefefe
| 86302 ||  || — || November 3, 1999 || Socorro || LINEAR || H || align=right | 1.4 km || 
|-id=303 bgcolor=#d6d6d6
| 86303 ||  || — || November 4, 1999 || Socorro || LINEAR || THM || align=right | 7.4 km || 
|-id=304 bgcolor=#d6d6d6
| 86304 ||  || — || November 4, 1999 || Socorro || LINEAR || THM || align=right | 5.6 km || 
|-id=305 bgcolor=#d6d6d6
| 86305 ||  || — || November 4, 1999 || Socorro || LINEAR || HYG || align=right | 5.1 km || 
|-id=306 bgcolor=#d6d6d6
| 86306 ||  || — || November 4, 1999 || Socorro || LINEAR || — || align=right | 8.1 km || 
|-id=307 bgcolor=#d6d6d6
| 86307 ||  || — || November 4, 1999 || Socorro || LINEAR || — || align=right | 3.2 km || 
|-id=308 bgcolor=#d6d6d6
| 86308 ||  || — || November 5, 1999 || Catalina || CSS || EUP || align=right | 10 km || 
|-id=309 bgcolor=#fefefe
| 86309 ||  || — || November 5, 1999 || Socorro || LINEAR || — || align=right | 1.2 km || 
|-id=310 bgcolor=#d6d6d6
| 86310 ||  || — || November 9, 1999 || Socorro || LINEAR || — || align=right | 5.2 km || 
|-id=311 bgcolor=#d6d6d6
| 86311 ||  || — || November 9, 1999 || Kitt Peak || Spacewatch || THM || align=right | 4.7 km || 
|-id=312 bgcolor=#d6d6d6
| 86312 ||  || — || November 12, 1999 || Socorro || LINEAR || — || align=right | 7.0 km || 
|-id=313 bgcolor=#d6d6d6
| 86313 ||  || — || November 14, 1999 || Socorro || LINEAR || — || align=right | 8.0 km || 
|-id=314 bgcolor=#d6d6d6
| 86314 ||  || — || November 14, 1999 || Socorro || LINEAR || HYG || align=right | 5.6 km || 
|-id=315 bgcolor=#d6d6d6
| 86315 ||  || — || November 6, 1999 || Socorro || LINEAR || — || align=right | 5.7 km || 
|-id=316 bgcolor=#d6d6d6
| 86316 ||  || — || November 6, 1999 || Socorro || LINEAR || — || align=right | 5.1 km || 
|-id=317 bgcolor=#d6d6d6
| 86317 ||  || — || November 1, 1999 || Anderson Mesa || LONEOS || — || align=right | 12 km || 
|-id=318 bgcolor=#d6d6d6
| 86318 ||  || — || November 1, 1999 || Anderson Mesa || LONEOS || EUP || align=right | 6.7 km || 
|-id=319 bgcolor=#d6d6d6
| 86319 ||  || — || November 1, 1999 || Catalina || CSS || — || align=right | 8.0 km || 
|-id=320 bgcolor=#d6d6d6
| 86320 ||  || — || November 4, 1999 || Anderson Mesa || LONEOS || — || align=right | 6.7 km || 
|-id=321 bgcolor=#fefefe
| 86321 ||  || — || November 4, 1999 || Socorro || LINEAR || H || align=right | 1.7 km || 
|-id=322 bgcolor=#d6d6d6
| 86322 ||  || — || November 3, 1999 || Socorro || LINEAR || — || align=right | 6.2 km || 
|-id=323 bgcolor=#d6d6d6
| 86323 ||  || — || November 3, 1999 || Socorro || LINEAR || HYG || align=right | 6.9 km || 
|-id=324 bgcolor=#FFC2E0
| 86324 ||  || — || November 16, 1999 || Socorro || LINEAR || AMO +1km || align=right | 2.1 km || 
|-id=325 bgcolor=#d6d6d6
| 86325 ||  || — || November 28, 1999 || Višnjan Observatory || K. Korlević || — || align=right | 7.8 km || 
|-id=326 bgcolor=#FFC2E0
| 86326 ||  || — || November 30, 1999 || Socorro || LINEAR || AMO +1km || align=right | 1.3 km || 
|-id=327 bgcolor=#d6d6d6
| 86327 ||  || — || November 29, 1999 || Višnjan Observatory || K. Korlević || — || align=right | 5.5 km || 
|-id=328 bgcolor=#d6d6d6
| 86328 ||  || — || December 4, 1999 || Catalina || CSS || — || align=right | 8.6 km || 
|-id=329 bgcolor=#fefefe
| 86329 ||  || — || December 2, 1999 || Anderson Mesa || LONEOS || H || align=right | 1.4 km || 
|-id=330 bgcolor=#fefefe
| 86330 ||  || — || December 6, 1999 || Socorro || LINEAR || H || align=right | 1.7 km || 
|-id=331 bgcolor=#d6d6d6
| 86331 ||  || — || December 5, 1999 || Socorro || LINEAR || ALA || align=right | 12 km || 
|-id=332 bgcolor=#d6d6d6
| 86332 ||  || — || December 5, 1999 || Socorro || LINEAR || — || align=right | 4.0 km || 
|-id=333 bgcolor=#d6d6d6
| 86333 ||  || — || December 6, 1999 || Socorro || LINEAR || — || align=right | 5.5 km || 
|-id=334 bgcolor=#d6d6d6
| 86334 ||  || — || December 6, 1999 || Socorro || LINEAR || THM || align=right | 7.1 km || 
|-id=335 bgcolor=#d6d6d6
| 86335 ||  || — || December 6, 1999 || Socorro || LINEAR || — || align=right | 9.2 km || 
|-id=336 bgcolor=#fefefe
| 86336 ||  || — || December 6, 1999 || Socorro || LINEAR || FLO || align=right | 2.3 km || 
|-id=337 bgcolor=#fefefe
| 86337 ||  || — || December 6, 1999 || Socorro || LINEAR || — || align=right | 2.1 km || 
|-id=338 bgcolor=#fefefe
| 86338 ||  || — || December 6, 1999 || Socorro || LINEAR || — || align=right | 1.8 km || 
|-id=339 bgcolor=#d6d6d6
| 86339 ||  || — || December 7, 1999 || Socorro || LINEAR || ALA || align=right | 9.0 km || 
|-id=340 bgcolor=#fefefe
| 86340 ||  || — || December 7, 1999 || Socorro || LINEAR || — || align=right | 1.1 km || 
|-id=341 bgcolor=#d6d6d6
| 86341 ||  || — || December 7, 1999 || Socorro || LINEAR || THM || align=right | 5.1 km || 
|-id=342 bgcolor=#fefefe
| 86342 ||  || — || December 7, 1999 || Socorro || LINEAR || NYS || align=right | 1.3 km || 
|-id=343 bgcolor=#d6d6d6
| 86343 ||  || — || December 7, 1999 || Socorro || LINEAR || 2:1J || align=right | 5.7 km || 
|-id=344 bgcolor=#fefefe
| 86344 ||  || — || December 7, 1999 || Socorro || LINEAR || — || align=right | 1.9 km || 
|-id=345 bgcolor=#fefefe
| 86345 ||  || — || December 7, 1999 || Socorro || LINEAR || FLO || align=right | 1.3 km || 
|-id=346 bgcolor=#fefefe
| 86346 ||  || — || December 7, 1999 || Socorro || LINEAR || FLO || align=right | 1.8 km || 
|-id=347 bgcolor=#fefefe
| 86347 ||  || — || December 7, 1999 || Socorro || LINEAR || FLO || align=right | 1.5 km || 
|-id=348 bgcolor=#d6d6d6
| 86348 ||  || — || December 7, 1999 || Socorro || LINEAR || — || align=right | 10 km || 
|-id=349 bgcolor=#fefefe
| 86349 ||  || — || December 7, 1999 || Socorro || LINEAR || — || align=right | 1.4 km || 
|-id=350 bgcolor=#fefefe
| 86350 ||  || — || December 7, 1999 || Socorro || LINEAR || FLO || align=right | 2.0 km || 
|-id=351 bgcolor=#fefefe
| 86351 ||  || — || December 11, 1999 || Oizumi || T. Kobayashi || — || align=right | 1.4 km || 
|-id=352 bgcolor=#fefefe
| 86352 ||  || — || December 7, 1999 || Socorro || LINEAR || — || align=right | 2.4 km || 
|-id=353 bgcolor=#d6d6d6
| 86353 ||  || — || December 11, 1999 || Socorro || LINEAR || — || align=right | 6.8 km || 
|-id=354 bgcolor=#d6d6d6
| 86354 ||  || — || December 5, 1999 || Catalina || CSS || EOS || align=right | 4.6 km || 
|-id=355 bgcolor=#fefefe
| 86355 ||  || — || December 5, 1999 || Catalina || CSS || — || align=right | 1.8 km || 
|-id=356 bgcolor=#d6d6d6
| 86356 ||  || — || December 7, 1999 || Catalina || CSS || — || align=right | 7.6 km || 
|-id=357 bgcolor=#d6d6d6
| 86357 ||  || — || December 7, 1999 || Catalina || CSS || — || align=right | 7.9 km || 
|-id=358 bgcolor=#d6d6d6
| 86358 ||  || — || December 14, 1999 || Fountain Hills || C. W. Juels || 2:1J || align=right | 13 km || 
|-id=359 bgcolor=#fefefe
| 86359 ||  || — || December 15, 1999 || Socorro || LINEAR || H || align=right | 1.6 km || 
|-id=360 bgcolor=#d6d6d6
| 86360 ||  || — || December 8, 1999 || Catalina || CSS || EUP || align=right | 11 km || 
|-id=361 bgcolor=#d6d6d6
| 86361 ||  || — || December 10, 1999 || Socorro || LINEAR || — || align=right | 9.1 km || 
|-id=362 bgcolor=#fefefe
| 86362 ||  || — || December 10, 1999 || Socorro || LINEAR || FLO || align=right | 4.2 km || 
|-id=363 bgcolor=#fefefe
| 86363 ||  || — || December 10, 1999 || Socorro || LINEAR || — || align=right | 2.9 km || 
|-id=364 bgcolor=#d6d6d6
| 86364 ||  || — || December 12, 1999 || Socorro || LINEAR || — || align=right | 11 km || 
|-id=365 bgcolor=#fefefe
| 86365 ||  || — || December 12, 1999 || Socorro || LINEAR || — || align=right | 1.5 km || 
|-id=366 bgcolor=#d6d6d6
| 86366 ||  || — || December 14, 1999 || Socorro || LINEAR || 3:2 || align=right | 10 km || 
|-id=367 bgcolor=#d6d6d6
| 86367 ||  || — || December 13, 1999 || Kitt Peak || Spacewatch || 2:1J || align=right | 6.3 km || 
|-id=368 bgcolor=#fefefe
| 86368 ||  || — || December 13, 1999 || Kitt Peak || Spacewatch || — || align=right | 1.5 km || 
|-id=369 bgcolor=#fefefe
| 86369 ||  || — || December 14, 1999 || Kitt Peak || Spacewatch || FLO || align=right | 1.6 km || 
|-id=370 bgcolor=#fefefe
| 86370 ||  || — || December 14, 1999 || Kitt Peak || Spacewatch || — || align=right | 1.2 km || 
|-id=371 bgcolor=#d6d6d6
| 86371 ||  || — || December 3, 1999 || Anderson Mesa || LONEOS || SYL7:4 || align=right | 9.8 km || 
|-id=372 bgcolor=#d6d6d6
| 86372 ||  || — || December 12, 1999 || Kitt Peak || Spacewatch || — || align=right | 3.6 km || 
|-id=373 bgcolor=#FA8072
| 86373 || 1999 YK || — || December 16, 1999 || Socorro || LINEAR || H || align=right | 1.7 km || 
|-id=374 bgcolor=#fefefe
| 86374 ||  || — || December 17, 1999 || Socorro || LINEAR || H || align=right | 1.5 km || 
|-id=375 bgcolor=#fefefe
| 86375 ||  || — || January 1, 2000 || San Marcello || L. Tesi, M. Tombelli || — || align=right | 3.3 km || 
|-id=376 bgcolor=#fefefe
| 86376 ||  || — || January 2, 2000 || San Marcello || L. Tesi, A. Boattini || — || align=right | 1.6 km || 
|-id=377 bgcolor=#C2FFFF
| 86377 ||  || — || January 3, 2000 || Socorro || LINEAR || L4 || align=right | 19 km || 
|-id=378 bgcolor=#d6d6d6
| 86378 ||  || — || January 3, 2000 || Socorro || LINEAR || — || align=right | 4.2 km || 
|-id=379 bgcolor=#fefefe
| 86379 ||  || — || January 3, 2000 || Socorro || LINEAR || FLO || align=right | 1.6 km || 
|-id=380 bgcolor=#fefefe
| 86380 ||  || — || January 3, 2000 || Socorro || LINEAR || — || align=right | 1.7 km || 
|-id=381 bgcolor=#fefefe
| 86381 ||  || — || January 3, 2000 || Socorro || LINEAR || — || align=right | 1.8 km || 
|-id=382 bgcolor=#fefefe
| 86382 ||  || — || January 3, 2000 || Socorro || LINEAR || — || align=right | 1.8 km || 
|-id=383 bgcolor=#fefefe
| 86383 ||  || — || January 3, 2000 || Socorro || LINEAR || H || align=right | 1.6 km || 
|-id=384 bgcolor=#fefefe
| 86384 ||  || — || January 4, 2000 || Socorro || LINEAR || — || align=right | 1.9 km || 
|-id=385 bgcolor=#d6d6d6
| 86385 ||  || — || January 4, 2000 || Socorro || LINEAR || ALA || align=right | 11 km || 
|-id=386 bgcolor=#fefefe
| 86386 ||  || — || January 4, 2000 || Socorro || LINEAR || FLO || align=right | 1.5 km || 
|-id=387 bgcolor=#fefefe
| 86387 ||  || — || January 4, 2000 || Socorro || LINEAR || — || align=right | 1.5 km || 
|-id=388 bgcolor=#fefefe
| 86388 ||  || — || January 4, 2000 || Socorro || LINEAR || — || align=right | 1.8 km || 
|-id=389 bgcolor=#fefefe
| 86389 ||  || — || January 4, 2000 || Socorro || LINEAR || FLO || align=right | 1.7 km || 
|-id=390 bgcolor=#fefefe
| 86390 ||  || — || January 5, 2000 || Socorro || LINEAR || — || align=right | 1.3 km || 
|-id=391 bgcolor=#fefefe
| 86391 ||  || — || January 5, 2000 || Socorro || LINEAR || — || align=right | 1.6 km || 
|-id=392 bgcolor=#fefefe
| 86392 ||  || — || January 5, 2000 || Socorro || LINEAR || FLO || align=right | 1.1 km || 
|-id=393 bgcolor=#fefefe
| 86393 ||  || — || January 5, 2000 || Socorro || LINEAR || — || align=right | 3.3 km || 
|-id=394 bgcolor=#fefefe
| 86394 ||  || — || January 5, 2000 || Socorro || LINEAR || FLO || align=right | 1.6 km || 
|-id=395 bgcolor=#fefefe
| 86395 ||  || — || January 5, 2000 || Socorro || LINEAR || — || align=right | 3.7 km || 
|-id=396 bgcolor=#fefefe
| 86396 ||  || — || January 5, 2000 || Socorro || LINEAR || FLO || align=right | 2.7 km || 
|-id=397 bgcolor=#d6d6d6
| 86397 ||  || — || January 5, 2000 || Socorro || LINEAR || — || align=right | 6.9 km || 
|-id=398 bgcolor=#d6d6d6
| 86398 ||  || — || January 5, 2000 || Socorro || LINEAR || HYG || align=right | 8.4 km || 
|-id=399 bgcolor=#fefefe
| 86399 ||  || — || January 5, 2000 || Socorro || LINEAR || — || align=right | 1.6 km || 
|-id=400 bgcolor=#fefefe
| 86400 ||  || — || January 5, 2000 || Socorro || LINEAR || FLO || align=right | 1.9 km || 
|}

86401–86500 

|-bgcolor=#FA8072
| 86401 ||  || — || January 5, 2000 || Socorro || LINEAR || — || align=right | 3.5 km || 
|-id=402 bgcolor=#fefefe
| 86402 ||  || — || January 5, 2000 || Socorro || LINEAR || H || align=right | 2.7 km || 
|-id=403 bgcolor=#d6d6d6
| 86403 ||  || — || January 6, 2000 || Socorro || LINEAR || LUT || align=right | 12 km || 
|-id=404 bgcolor=#d6d6d6
| 86404 ||  || — || January 7, 2000 || Socorro || LINEAR || — || align=right | 4.9 km || 
|-id=405 bgcolor=#fefefe
| 86405 ||  || — || January 8, 2000 || Socorro || LINEAR || H || align=right | 1.3 km || 
|-id=406 bgcolor=#fefefe
| 86406 ||  || — || January 8, 2000 || Socorro || LINEAR || PHO || align=right | 2.2 km || 
|-id=407 bgcolor=#d6d6d6
| 86407 ||  || — || January 7, 2000 || Socorro || LINEAR || — || align=right | 8.1 km || 
|-id=408 bgcolor=#fefefe
| 86408 ||  || — || January 7, 2000 || Socorro || LINEAR || FLO || align=right | 1.2 km || 
|-id=409 bgcolor=#d6d6d6
| 86409 ||  || — || January 8, 2000 || Socorro || LINEAR || LIX || align=right | 8.7 km || 
|-id=410 bgcolor=#d6d6d6
| 86410 ||  || — || January 8, 2000 || Socorro || LINEAR || — || align=right | 6.8 km || 
|-id=411 bgcolor=#fefefe
| 86411 ||  || — || January 9, 2000 || Socorro || LINEAR || H || align=right | 1.4 km || 
|-id=412 bgcolor=#fefefe
| 86412 ||  || — || January 10, 2000 || Socorro || LINEAR || — || align=right | 2.2 km || 
|-id=413 bgcolor=#fefefe
| 86413 ||  || — || January 10, 2000 || Socorro || LINEAR || PHO || align=right | 2.8 km || 
|-id=414 bgcolor=#fefefe
| 86414 ||  || — || January 5, 2000 || Kitt Peak || Spacewatch || V || align=right | 1.5 km || 
|-id=415 bgcolor=#fefefe
| 86415 ||  || — || January 8, 2000 || Kitt Peak || Spacewatch || — || align=right | 1.5 km || 
|-id=416 bgcolor=#fefefe
| 86416 ||  || — || January 4, 2000 || Socorro || LINEAR || V || align=right | 1.6 km || 
|-id=417 bgcolor=#d6d6d6
| 86417 ||  || — || January 7, 2000 || Anderson Mesa || LONEOS || THB || align=right | 7.9 km || 
|-id=418 bgcolor=#d6d6d6
| 86418 ||  || — || January 8, 2000 || Socorro || LINEAR || MEL || align=right | 4.6 km || 
|-id=419 bgcolor=#fefefe
| 86419 ||  || — || January 9, 2000 || Socorro || LINEAR || H || align=right | 2.3 km || 
|-id=420 bgcolor=#fefefe
| 86420 ||  || — || January 26, 2000 || Socorro || LINEAR || H || align=right | 1.8 km || 
|-id=421 bgcolor=#fefefe
| 86421 ||  || — || January 26, 2000 || Višnjan Observatory || K. Korlević || — || align=right | 1.8 km || 
|-id=422 bgcolor=#fefefe
| 86422 ||  || — || January 29, 2000 || Kitt Peak || Spacewatch || V || align=right | 1.4 km || 
|-id=423 bgcolor=#fefefe
| 86423 ||  || — || January 26, 2000 || Kitt Peak || Spacewatch || FLO || align=right | 2.3 km || 
|-id=424 bgcolor=#fefefe
| 86424 ||  || — || January 28, 2000 || Kitt Peak || Spacewatch || — || align=right | 1.6 km || 
|-id=425 bgcolor=#fefefe
| 86425 ||  || — || January 26, 2000 || Višnjan Observatory || K. Korlević || — || align=right | 1.6 km || 
|-id=426 bgcolor=#E9E9E9
| 86426 ||  || — || January 27, 2000 || Socorro || LINEAR || — || align=right | 3.7 km || 
|-id=427 bgcolor=#fefefe
| 86427 ||  || — || January 30, 2000 || Socorro || LINEAR || V || align=right | 1.6 km || 
|-id=428 bgcolor=#fefefe
| 86428 ||  || — || January 30, 2000 || Socorro || LINEAR || — || align=right | 1.5 km || 
|-id=429 bgcolor=#d6d6d6
| 86429 ||  || — || January 31, 2000 || Socorro || LINEAR || — || align=right | 11 km || 
|-id=430 bgcolor=#fefefe
| 86430 ||  || — || January 27, 2000 || Kitt Peak || Spacewatch || V || align=right | 1.7 km || 
|-id=431 bgcolor=#fefefe
| 86431 ||  || — || January 16, 2000 || Kitt Peak || Spacewatch || — || align=right | 1.4 km || 
|-id=432 bgcolor=#fefefe
| 86432 ||  || — || January 30, 2000 || Catalina || CSS || — || align=right | 1.3 km || 
|-id=433 bgcolor=#fefefe
| 86433 ||  || — || February 4, 2000 || Rock Finder || W. K. Y. Yeung || EUT || align=right | 1.4 km || 
|-id=434 bgcolor=#fefefe
| 86434 ||  || — || February 2, 2000 || Socorro || LINEAR || — || align=right | 1.8 km || 
|-id=435 bgcolor=#d6d6d6
| 86435 ||  || — || February 2, 2000 || Socorro || LINEAR || HIL3:2 || align=right | 14 km || 
|-id=436 bgcolor=#fefefe
| 86436 ||  || — || February 2, 2000 || Socorro || LINEAR || — || align=right | 1.2 km || 
|-id=437 bgcolor=#fefefe
| 86437 ||  || — || February 2, 2000 || Socorro || LINEAR || — || align=right | 3.2 km || 
|-id=438 bgcolor=#fefefe
| 86438 ||  || — || February 2, 2000 || Socorro || LINEAR || FLO || align=right | 2.0 km || 
|-id=439 bgcolor=#fefefe
| 86439 ||  || — || February 2, 2000 || Socorro || LINEAR || — || align=right | 2.5 km || 
|-id=440 bgcolor=#fefefe
| 86440 ||  || — || February 2, 2000 || Socorro || LINEAR || — || align=right | 3.4 km || 
|-id=441 bgcolor=#fefefe
| 86441 ||  || — || February 2, 2000 || Socorro || LINEAR || FLO || align=right | 1.2 km || 
|-id=442 bgcolor=#fefefe
| 86442 ||  || — || February 2, 2000 || Socorro || LINEAR || — || align=right | 1.8 km || 
|-id=443 bgcolor=#fefefe
| 86443 ||  || — || February 2, 2000 || Socorro || LINEAR || — || align=right | 1.7 km || 
|-id=444 bgcolor=#fefefe
| 86444 ||  || — || February 2, 2000 || Socorro || LINEAR || V || align=right | 1.7 km || 
|-id=445 bgcolor=#fefefe
| 86445 ||  || — || February 2, 2000 || Socorro || LINEAR || — || align=right | 1.5 km || 
|-id=446 bgcolor=#fefefe
| 86446 ||  || — || February 2, 2000 || Socorro || LINEAR || — || align=right | 2.2 km || 
|-id=447 bgcolor=#fefefe
| 86447 ||  || — || February 2, 2000 || Socorro || LINEAR || — || align=right | 1.7 km || 
|-id=448 bgcolor=#fefefe
| 86448 ||  || — || February 2, 2000 || Socorro || LINEAR || — || align=right | 1.4 km || 
|-id=449 bgcolor=#fefefe
| 86449 ||  || — || February 2, 2000 || Socorro || LINEAR || FLO || align=right | 1.2 km || 
|-id=450 bgcolor=#FFC2E0
| 86450 ||  || — || February 2, 2000 || Socorro || LINEAR || ATE || align=right data-sort-value="0.76" | 760 m || 
|-id=451 bgcolor=#fefefe
| 86451 ||  || — || February 2, 2000 || Socorro || LINEAR || FLO || align=right | 1.3 km || 
|-id=452 bgcolor=#fefefe
| 86452 ||  || — || February 2, 2000 || Socorro || LINEAR || — || align=right | 1.9 km || 
|-id=453 bgcolor=#fefefe
| 86453 ||  || — || February 4, 2000 || Socorro || LINEAR || — || align=right | 1.8 km || 
|-id=454 bgcolor=#fefefe
| 86454 ||  || — || February 5, 2000 || Socorro || LINEAR || PHO || align=right | 2.6 km || 
|-id=455 bgcolor=#fefefe
| 86455 ||  || — || February 6, 2000 || Prescott || P. G. Comba || — || align=right | 2.4 km || 
|-id=456 bgcolor=#fefefe
| 86456 ||  || — || February 2, 2000 || Socorro || LINEAR || — || align=right | 1.9 km || 
|-id=457 bgcolor=#fefefe
| 86457 ||  || — || February 2, 2000 || Socorro || LINEAR || FLO || align=right | 1.5 km || 
|-id=458 bgcolor=#fefefe
| 86458 ||  || — || February 2, 2000 || Socorro || LINEAR || V || align=right | 1.1 km || 
|-id=459 bgcolor=#fefefe
| 86459 ||  || — || February 2, 2000 || Socorro || LINEAR || — || align=right | 1.8 km || 
|-id=460 bgcolor=#fefefe
| 86460 ||  || — || February 2, 2000 || Socorro || LINEAR || — || align=right | 1.5 km || 
|-id=461 bgcolor=#fefefe
| 86461 ||  || — || February 2, 2000 || Socorro || LINEAR || — || align=right | 1.8 km || 
|-id=462 bgcolor=#fefefe
| 86462 ||  || — || February 4, 2000 || Socorro || LINEAR || — || align=right | 2.0 km || 
|-id=463 bgcolor=#fefefe
| 86463 ||  || — || February 5, 2000 || Socorro || LINEAR || V || align=right | 1.5 km || 
|-id=464 bgcolor=#fefefe
| 86464 ||  || — || February 2, 2000 || Socorro || LINEAR || — || align=right | 1.7 km || 
|-id=465 bgcolor=#fefefe
| 86465 ||  || — || February 2, 2000 || Socorro || LINEAR || — || align=right | 1.8 km || 
|-id=466 bgcolor=#fefefe
| 86466 ||  || — || February 6, 2000 || Socorro || LINEAR || — || align=right | 2.8 km || 
|-id=467 bgcolor=#fefefe
| 86467 ||  || — || February 2, 2000 || Socorro || LINEAR || — || align=right | 2.6 km || 
|-id=468 bgcolor=#fefefe
| 86468 ||  || — || February 7, 2000 || Socorro || LINEAR || FLO || align=right | 2.0 km || 
|-id=469 bgcolor=#fefefe
| 86469 ||  || — || February 7, 2000 || Socorro || LINEAR || FLO || align=right | 2.1 km || 
|-id=470 bgcolor=#fefefe
| 86470 ||  || — || February 10, 2000 || Višnjan Observatory || K. Korlević || NYS || align=right | 1.1 km || 
|-id=471 bgcolor=#fefefe
| 86471 ||  || — || February 10, 2000 || Višnjan Observatory || K. Korlević || — || align=right | 2.0 km || 
|-id=472 bgcolor=#fefefe
| 86472 ||  || — || February 10, 2000 || Višnjan Observatory || K. Korlević || — || align=right | 1.9 km || 
|-id=473 bgcolor=#fefefe
| 86473 ||  || — || February 8, 2000 || Kitt Peak || Spacewatch || NYS || align=right data-sort-value="0.98" | 980 m || 
|-id=474 bgcolor=#E9E9E9
| 86474 ||  || — || February 8, 2000 || Kitt Peak || Spacewatch || AGN || align=right | 2.9 km || 
|-id=475 bgcolor=#fefefe
| 86475 ||  || — || February 4, 2000 || Socorro || LINEAR || — || align=right | 1.9 km || 
|-id=476 bgcolor=#fefefe
| 86476 ||  || — || February 4, 2000 || Socorro || LINEAR || MAS || align=right | 1.4 km || 
|-id=477 bgcolor=#fefefe
| 86477 ||  || — || February 4, 2000 || Socorro || LINEAR || — || align=right | 3.2 km || 
|-id=478 bgcolor=#fefefe
| 86478 ||  || — || February 4, 2000 || Socorro || LINEAR || V || align=right | 1.9 km || 
|-id=479 bgcolor=#fefefe
| 86479 ||  || — || February 6, 2000 || Socorro || LINEAR || — || align=right | 2.4 km || 
|-id=480 bgcolor=#fefefe
| 86480 ||  || — || February 9, 2000 || Siding Spring || R. H. McNaught || — || align=right | 1.7 km || 
|-id=481 bgcolor=#fefefe
| 86481 ||  || — || February 4, 2000 || Socorro || LINEAR || NYS || align=right | 1.1 km || 
|-id=482 bgcolor=#fefefe
| 86482 ||  || — || February 7, 2000 || Xinglong || SCAP || — || align=right | 1.4 km || 
|-id=483 bgcolor=#fefefe
| 86483 ||  || — || February 6, 2000 || Catalina || CSS || NYS || align=right | 1.4 km || 
|-id=484 bgcolor=#E9E9E9
| 86484 ||  || — || February 2, 2000 || Socorro || LINEAR || — || align=right | 1.6 km || 
|-id=485 bgcolor=#fefefe
| 86485 ||  || — || February 3, 2000 || Socorro || LINEAR || — || align=right | 1.3 km || 
|-id=486 bgcolor=#fefefe
| 86486 ||  || — || February 4, 2000 || Kitt Peak || Spacewatch || — || align=right data-sort-value="0.97" | 970 m || 
|-id=487 bgcolor=#fefefe
| 86487 ||  || — || February 6, 2000 || Kitt Peak || Spacewatch || — || align=right | 1.8 km || 
|-id=488 bgcolor=#fefefe
| 86488 ||  || — || February 25, 2000 || Socorro || LINEAR || NYS || align=right | 1.4 km || 
|-id=489 bgcolor=#fefefe
| 86489 ||  || — || February 26, 2000 || Kitt Peak || Spacewatch || — || align=right | 1.7 km || 
|-id=490 bgcolor=#fefefe
| 86490 ||  || — || February 26, 2000 || Catalina || CSS || — || align=right | 2.5 km || 
|-id=491 bgcolor=#d6d6d6
| 86491 ||  || — || February 26, 2000 || Catalina || CSS || — || align=right | 6.2 km || 
|-id=492 bgcolor=#fefefe
| 86492 ||  || — || February 26, 2000 || Catalina || CSS || V || align=right | 1.5 km || 
|-id=493 bgcolor=#fefefe
| 86493 ||  || — || February 29, 2000 || Socorro || LINEAR || — || align=right | 1.7 km || 
|-id=494 bgcolor=#fefefe
| 86494 ||  || — || February 29, 2000 || Socorro || LINEAR || ERI || align=right | 3.4 km || 
|-id=495 bgcolor=#fefefe
| 86495 ||  || — || February 29, 2000 || Socorro || LINEAR || — || align=right | 1.9 km || 
|-id=496 bgcolor=#fefefe
| 86496 ||  || — || February 29, 2000 || Socorro || LINEAR || FLO || align=right | 1.4 km || 
|-id=497 bgcolor=#fefefe
| 86497 ||  || — || February 29, 2000 || Socorro || LINEAR || — || align=right | 1.0 km || 
|-id=498 bgcolor=#fefefe
| 86498 ||  || — || February 29, 2000 || Socorro || LINEAR || V || align=right | 1.6 km || 
|-id=499 bgcolor=#fefefe
| 86499 ||  || — || February 29, 2000 || Socorro || LINEAR || NYS || align=right | 1.5 km || 
|-id=500 bgcolor=#fefefe
| 86500 ||  || — || February 29, 2000 || Socorro || LINEAR || — || align=right | 1.7 km || 
|}

86501–86600 

|-bgcolor=#d6d6d6
| 86501 ||  || — || February 29, 2000 || Socorro || LINEAR || CHA || align=right | 4.3 km || 
|-id=502 bgcolor=#fefefe
| 86502 ||  || — || February 29, 2000 || Socorro || LINEAR || — || align=right | 1.7 km || 
|-id=503 bgcolor=#d6d6d6
| 86503 ||  || — || February 29, 2000 || Socorro || LINEAR || — || align=right | 5.0 km || 
|-id=504 bgcolor=#fefefe
| 86504 ||  || — || February 29, 2000 || Socorro || LINEAR || V || align=right | 1.1 km || 
|-id=505 bgcolor=#fefefe
| 86505 ||  || — || February 29, 2000 || Socorro || LINEAR || FLO || align=right | 1.3 km || 
|-id=506 bgcolor=#fefefe
| 86506 ||  || — || February 29, 2000 || Socorro || LINEAR || — || align=right | 1.6 km || 
|-id=507 bgcolor=#fefefe
| 86507 ||  || — || February 29, 2000 || Socorro || LINEAR || — || align=right | 1.3 km || 
|-id=508 bgcolor=#fefefe
| 86508 ||  || — || February 29, 2000 || Socorro || LINEAR || — || align=right | 1.8 km || 
|-id=509 bgcolor=#fefefe
| 86509 ||  || — || February 29, 2000 || Socorro || LINEAR || NYS || align=right | 1.2 km || 
|-id=510 bgcolor=#fefefe
| 86510 ||  || — || February 29, 2000 || Socorro || LINEAR || NYS || align=right | 1.2 km || 
|-id=511 bgcolor=#fefefe
| 86511 ||  || — || February 29, 2000 || Socorro || LINEAR || — || align=right | 3.5 km || 
|-id=512 bgcolor=#fefefe
| 86512 ||  || — || February 29, 2000 || Socorro || LINEAR || — || align=right | 1.6 km || 
|-id=513 bgcolor=#fefefe
| 86513 ||  || — || February 29, 2000 || Socorro || LINEAR || — || align=right | 1.6 km || 
|-id=514 bgcolor=#fefefe
| 86514 ||  || — || February 29, 2000 || Socorro || LINEAR || — || align=right | 2.3 km || 
|-id=515 bgcolor=#fefefe
| 86515 ||  || — || February 29, 2000 || Socorro || LINEAR || — || align=right | 1.6 km || 
|-id=516 bgcolor=#fefefe
| 86516 ||  || — || February 29, 2000 || Socorro || LINEAR || V || align=right | 1.5 km || 
|-id=517 bgcolor=#fefefe
| 86517 ||  || — || February 29, 2000 || Socorro || LINEAR || FLO || align=right | 1.3 km || 
|-id=518 bgcolor=#E9E9E9
| 86518 ||  || — || February 29, 2000 || Socorro || LINEAR || — || align=right | 1.9 km || 
|-id=519 bgcolor=#E9E9E9
| 86519 ||  || — || February 29, 2000 || Socorro || LINEAR || — || align=right | 3.2 km || 
|-id=520 bgcolor=#fefefe
| 86520 ||  || — || February 29, 2000 || Socorro || LINEAR || V || align=right | 2.0 km || 
|-id=521 bgcolor=#fefefe
| 86521 ||  || — || February 29, 2000 || Socorro || LINEAR || NYS || align=right | 1.3 km || 
|-id=522 bgcolor=#fefefe
| 86522 ||  || — || February 29, 2000 || Socorro || LINEAR || — || align=right | 1.8 km || 
|-id=523 bgcolor=#fefefe
| 86523 ||  || — || February 29, 2000 || Socorro || LINEAR || — || align=right | 1.8 km || 
|-id=524 bgcolor=#fefefe
| 86524 ||  || — || February 29, 2000 || Socorro || LINEAR || NYS || align=right | 1.4 km || 
|-id=525 bgcolor=#fefefe
| 86525 ||  || — || February 29, 2000 || Socorro || LINEAR || — || align=right | 1.6 km || 
|-id=526 bgcolor=#fefefe
| 86526 ||  || — || February 29, 2000 || Socorro || LINEAR || V || align=right | 1.8 km || 
|-id=527 bgcolor=#fefefe
| 86527 ||  || — || February 29, 2000 || Socorro || LINEAR || — || align=right | 1.7 km || 
|-id=528 bgcolor=#fefefe
| 86528 ||  || — || February 29, 2000 || Socorro || LINEAR || — || align=right | 1.4 km || 
|-id=529 bgcolor=#fefefe
| 86529 ||  || — || February 28, 2000 || Socorro || LINEAR || — || align=right | 2.2 km || 
|-id=530 bgcolor=#d6d6d6
| 86530 ||  || — || February 28, 2000 || Socorro || LINEAR || — || align=right | 5.6 km || 
|-id=531 bgcolor=#fefefe
| 86531 ||  || — || February 28, 2000 || Socorro || LINEAR || V || align=right | 1.5 km || 
|-id=532 bgcolor=#fefefe
| 86532 ||  || — || February 29, 2000 || Socorro || LINEAR || FLO || align=right | 3.1 km || 
|-id=533 bgcolor=#fefefe
| 86533 ||  || — || February 29, 2000 || Socorro || LINEAR || — || align=right | 2.2 km || 
|-id=534 bgcolor=#FA8072
| 86534 ||  || — || February 29, 2000 || Socorro || LINEAR || — || align=right | 1.7 km || 
|-id=535 bgcolor=#fefefe
| 86535 ||  || — || February 29, 2000 || Socorro || LINEAR || FLO || align=right | 1.5 km || 
|-id=536 bgcolor=#fefefe
| 86536 ||  || — || February 29, 2000 || Socorro || LINEAR || FLO || align=right | 1.9 km || 
|-id=537 bgcolor=#fefefe
| 86537 ||  || — || February 29, 2000 || Socorro || LINEAR || — || align=right | 2.2 km || 
|-id=538 bgcolor=#fefefe
| 86538 ||  || — || February 29, 2000 || Socorro || LINEAR || — || align=right | 3.0 km || 
|-id=539 bgcolor=#fefefe
| 86539 ||  || — || February 29, 2000 || Socorro || LINEAR || FLO || align=right | 1.8 km || 
|-id=540 bgcolor=#fefefe
| 86540 ||  || — || February 29, 2000 || Socorro || LINEAR || — || align=right | 1.7 km || 
|-id=541 bgcolor=#fefefe
| 86541 ||  || — || February 29, 2000 || Socorro || LINEAR || — || align=right | 1.7 km || 
|-id=542 bgcolor=#fefefe
| 86542 ||  || — || February 29, 2000 || Socorro || LINEAR || FLO || align=right | 1.4 km || 
|-id=543 bgcolor=#fefefe
| 86543 ||  || — || February 29, 2000 || Socorro || LINEAR || FLO || align=right | 1.6 km || 
|-id=544 bgcolor=#fefefe
| 86544 ||  || — || February 29, 2000 || Socorro || LINEAR || FLO || align=right | 2.0 km || 
|-id=545 bgcolor=#fefefe
| 86545 ||  || — || February 29, 2000 || Socorro || LINEAR || — || align=right data-sort-value="0.99" | 990 m || 
|-id=546 bgcolor=#fefefe
| 86546 ||  || — || February 29, 2000 || Socorro || LINEAR || FLO || align=right | 1.4 km || 
|-id=547 bgcolor=#fefefe
| 86547 ||  || — || February 28, 2000 || Kitt Peak || Spacewatch || — || align=right | 1.2 km || 
|-id=548 bgcolor=#fefefe
| 86548 ||  || — || February 27, 2000 || Catalina || CSS || — || align=right | 1.6 km || 
|-id=549 bgcolor=#fefefe
| 86549 || 2000 EG || — || March 2, 2000 || Prescott || P. G. Comba || — || align=right | 1.7 km || 
|-id=550 bgcolor=#fefefe
| 86550 ||  || — || March 3, 2000 || Socorro || LINEAR || — || align=right | 1.5 km || 
|-id=551 bgcolor=#fefefe
| 86551 Seth ||  ||  || March 4, 2000 || Lake Tekapo || N. Brady || FLO || align=right | 1.9 km || 
|-id=552 bgcolor=#fefefe
| 86552 ||  || — || March 2, 2000 || Kitt Peak || Spacewatch || FLO || align=right | 1.2 km || 
|-id=553 bgcolor=#fefefe
| 86553 ||  || — || March 3, 2000 || Socorro || LINEAR || — || align=right | 2.1 km || 
|-id=554 bgcolor=#fefefe
| 86554 ||  || — || March 3, 2000 || Socorro || LINEAR || — || align=right | 1.6 km || 
|-id=555 bgcolor=#fefefe
| 86555 ||  || — || March 4, 2000 || Socorro || LINEAR || PHO || align=right | 2.7 km || 
|-id=556 bgcolor=#fefefe
| 86556 ||  || — || March 4, 2000 || Socorro || LINEAR || — || align=right | 2.0 km || 
|-id=557 bgcolor=#fefefe
| 86557 ||  || — || March 3, 2000 || Kitt Peak || Spacewatch || NYS || align=right | 1.2 km || 
|-id=558 bgcolor=#fefefe
| 86558 ||  || — || March 3, 2000 || Socorro || LINEAR || — || align=right | 2.0 km || 
|-id=559 bgcolor=#fefefe
| 86559 ||  || — || March 13, 2000 || Socorro || LINEAR || — || align=right | 2.9 km || 
|-id=560 bgcolor=#fefefe
| 86560 ||  || — || March 5, 2000 || Socorro || LINEAR || V || align=right | 1.4 km || 
|-id=561 bgcolor=#fefefe
| 86561 ||  || — || March 8, 2000 || Kitt Peak || Spacewatch || — || align=right | 1.3 km || 
|-id=562 bgcolor=#fefefe
| 86562 ||  || — || March 8, 2000 || Kitt Peak || Spacewatch || NYS || align=right | 1.4 km || 
|-id=563 bgcolor=#fefefe
| 86563 ||  || — || March 4, 2000 || Socorro || LINEAR || — || align=right | 1.6 km || 
|-id=564 bgcolor=#fefefe
| 86564 ||  || — || March 4, 2000 || Socorro || LINEAR || — || align=right | 1.8 km || 
|-id=565 bgcolor=#fefefe
| 86565 ||  || — || March 5, 2000 || Socorro || LINEAR || FLO || align=right | 1.8 km || 
|-id=566 bgcolor=#fefefe
| 86566 ||  || — || March 5, 2000 || Socorro || LINEAR || — || align=right | 2.4 km || 
|-id=567 bgcolor=#fefefe
| 86567 ||  || — || March 5, 2000 || Socorro || LINEAR || — || align=right | 2.8 km || 
|-id=568 bgcolor=#fefefe
| 86568 ||  || — || March 5, 2000 || Socorro || LINEAR || NYS || align=right | 1.7 km || 
|-id=569 bgcolor=#d6d6d6
| 86569 ||  || — || March 5, 2000 || Socorro || LINEAR || — || align=right | 5.2 km || 
|-id=570 bgcolor=#fefefe
| 86570 ||  || — || March 8, 2000 || Socorro || LINEAR || FLO || align=right | 1.7 km || 
|-id=571 bgcolor=#fefefe
| 86571 ||  || — || March 8, 2000 || Socorro || LINEAR || NYS || align=right | 1.8 km || 
|-id=572 bgcolor=#fefefe
| 86572 ||  || — || March 8, 2000 || Socorro || LINEAR || — || align=right | 1.6 km || 
|-id=573 bgcolor=#fefefe
| 86573 ||  || — || March 8, 2000 || Socorro || LINEAR || NYS || align=right | 1.1 km || 
|-id=574 bgcolor=#fefefe
| 86574 ||  || — || March 8, 2000 || Socorro || LINEAR || NYS || align=right | 4.6 km || 
|-id=575 bgcolor=#fefefe
| 86575 ||  || — || March 8, 2000 || Socorro || LINEAR || MAS || align=right | 1.4 km || 
|-id=576 bgcolor=#fefefe
| 86576 ||  || — || March 9, 2000 || Socorro || LINEAR || NYS || align=right | 1.3 km || 
|-id=577 bgcolor=#fefefe
| 86577 ||  || — || March 9, 2000 || Socorro || LINEAR || V || align=right | 1.6 km || 
|-id=578 bgcolor=#fefefe
| 86578 ||  || — || March 9, 2000 || Socorro || LINEAR || FLO || align=right | 1.4 km || 
|-id=579 bgcolor=#fefefe
| 86579 ||  || — || March 9, 2000 || Socorro || LINEAR || — || align=right | 1.4 km || 
|-id=580 bgcolor=#fefefe
| 86580 ||  || — || March 9, 2000 || Socorro || LINEAR || FLO || align=right | 2.7 km || 
|-id=581 bgcolor=#fefefe
| 86581 ||  || — || March 10, 2000 || Kitt Peak || Spacewatch || — || align=right | 3.8 km || 
|-id=582 bgcolor=#fefefe
| 86582 ||  || — || March 8, 2000 || Socorro || LINEAR || — || align=right | 2.6 km || 
|-id=583 bgcolor=#fefefe
| 86583 ||  || — || March 8, 2000 || Socorro || LINEAR || — || align=right | 1.9 km || 
|-id=584 bgcolor=#fefefe
| 86584 ||  || — || March 8, 2000 || Socorro || LINEAR || — || align=right | 1.7 km || 
|-id=585 bgcolor=#fefefe
| 86585 ||  || — || March 8, 2000 || Socorro || LINEAR || — || align=right | 1.7 km || 
|-id=586 bgcolor=#fefefe
| 86586 ||  || — || March 8, 2000 || Socorro || LINEAR || NYS || align=right | 1.3 km || 
|-id=587 bgcolor=#fefefe
| 86587 ||  || — || March 10, 2000 || Socorro || LINEAR || — || align=right | 1.5 km || 
|-id=588 bgcolor=#fefefe
| 86588 ||  || — || March 10, 2000 || Socorro || LINEAR || NYS || align=right | 1.4 km || 
|-id=589 bgcolor=#fefefe
| 86589 ||  || — || March 10, 2000 || Socorro || LINEAR || — || align=right | 1.5 km || 
|-id=590 bgcolor=#fefefe
| 86590 ||  || — || March 10, 2000 || Socorro || LINEAR || MAS || align=right | 1.5 km || 
|-id=591 bgcolor=#fefefe
| 86591 ||  || — || March 10, 2000 || Socorro || LINEAR || FLO || align=right | 3.3 km || 
|-id=592 bgcolor=#fefefe
| 86592 ||  || — || March 10, 2000 || Socorro || LINEAR || — || align=right | 1.4 km || 
|-id=593 bgcolor=#fefefe
| 86593 ||  || — || March 10, 2000 || Socorro || LINEAR || — || align=right | 1.3 km || 
|-id=594 bgcolor=#fefefe
| 86594 ||  || — || March 10, 2000 || Socorro || LINEAR || — || align=right | 1.8 km || 
|-id=595 bgcolor=#fefefe
| 86595 ||  || — || March 10, 2000 || Socorro || LINEAR || — || align=right | 1.5 km || 
|-id=596 bgcolor=#fefefe
| 86596 ||  || — || March 10, 2000 || Socorro || LINEAR || V || align=right | 1.4 km || 
|-id=597 bgcolor=#fefefe
| 86597 ||  || — || March 10, 2000 || Socorro || LINEAR || MAS || align=right | 1.3 km || 
|-id=598 bgcolor=#fefefe
| 86598 ||  || — || March 10, 2000 || Socorro || LINEAR || — || align=right | 2.4 km || 
|-id=599 bgcolor=#fefefe
| 86599 ||  || — || March 10, 2000 || Socorro || LINEAR || — || align=right | 1.5 km || 
|-id=600 bgcolor=#fefefe
| 86600 ||  || — || March 11, 2000 || Kitt Peak || Spacewatch || — || align=right | 1.1 km || 
|}

86601–86700 

|-bgcolor=#fefefe
| 86601 ||  || — || March 5, 2000 || Socorro || LINEAR || — || align=right | 1.9 km || 
|-id=602 bgcolor=#fefefe
| 86602 ||  || — || March 5, 2000 || Socorro || LINEAR || V || align=right | 1.7 km || 
|-id=603 bgcolor=#fefefe
| 86603 ||  || — || March 5, 2000 || Socorro || LINEAR || NYS || align=right | 1.3 km || 
|-id=604 bgcolor=#fefefe
| 86604 ||  || — || March 5, 2000 || Socorro || LINEAR || NYS || align=right | 1.3 km || 
|-id=605 bgcolor=#E9E9E9
| 86605 ||  || — || March 5, 2000 || Socorro || LINEAR || — || align=right | 4.4 km || 
|-id=606 bgcolor=#fefefe
| 86606 ||  || — || March 5, 2000 || Socorro || LINEAR || NYS || align=right | 1.3 km || 
|-id=607 bgcolor=#fefefe
| 86607 ||  || — || March 8, 2000 || Socorro || LINEAR || — || align=right | 1.5 km || 
|-id=608 bgcolor=#FA8072
| 86608 ||  || — || March 8, 2000 || Socorro || LINEAR || — || align=right | 2.1 km || 
|-id=609 bgcolor=#fefefe
| 86609 ||  || — || March 9, 2000 || Socorro || LINEAR || ERI || align=right | 3.6 km || 
|-id=610 bgcolor=#fefefe
| 86610 ||  || — || March 9, 2000 || Socorro || LINEAR || FLO || align=right | 2.0 km || 
|-id=611 bgcolor=#fefefe
| 86611 ||  || — || March 9, 2000 || Socorro || LINEAR || FLO || align=right | 2.6 km || 
|-id=612 bgcolor=#fefefe
| 86612 ||  || — || March 12, 2000 || Socorro || LINEAR || H || align=right | 2.3 km || 
|-id=613 bgcolor=#fefefe
| 86613 ||  || — || March 10, 2000 || Kitt Peak || Spacewatch || — || align=right | 1.8 km || 
|-id=614 bgcolor=#fefefe
| 86614 ||  || — || March 9, 2000 || Socorro || LINEAR || V || align=right | 1.8 km || 
|-id=615 bgcolor=#fefefe
| 86615 ||  || — || March 8, 2000 || Haleakala || NEAT || FLO || align=right | 1.3 km || 
|-id=616 bgcolor=#fefefe
| 86616 ||  || — || March 8, 2000 || Haleakala || NEAT || NYS || align=right | 1.5 km || 
|-id=617 bgcolor=#fefefe
| 86617 ||  || — || March 9, 2000 || Socorro || LINEAR || — || align=right | 2.9 km || 
|-id=618 bgcolor=#fefefe
| 86618 ||  || — || March 10, 2000 || Socorro || LINEAR || NYS || align=right | 1.0 km || 
|-id=619 bgcolor=#fefefe
| 86619 ||  || — || March 11, 2000 || Anderson Mesa || LONEOS || FLO || align=right | 2.0 km || 
|-id=620 bgcolor=#fefefe
| 86620 ||  || — || March 11, 2000 || Anderson Mesa || LONEOS || V || align=right | 1.6 km || 
|-id=621 bgcolor=#fefefe
| 86621 ||  || — || March 11, 2000 || Anderson Mesa || LONEOS || — || align=right | 1.3 km || 
|-id=622 bgcolor=#fefefe
| 86622 ||  || — || March 11, 2000 || Catalina || CSS || — || align=right | 2.0 km || 
|-id=623 bgcolor=#fefefe
| 86623 ||  || — || March 11, 2000 || Anderson Mesa || LONEOS || — || align=right | 2.2 km || 
|-id=624 bgcolor=#fefefe
| 86624 ||  || — || March 11, 2000 || Catalina || CSS || — || align=right | 3.3 km || 
|-id=625 bgcolor=#fefefe
| 86625 ||  || — || March 11, 2000 || Anderson Mesa || LONEOS || — || align=right | 4.2 km || 
|-id=626 bgcolor=#FA8072
| 86626 ||  || — || March 11, 2000 || Anderson Mesa || LONEOS || — || align=right | 2.0 km || 
|-id=627 bgcolor=#fefefe
| 86627 ||  || — || March 11, 2000 || Anderson Mesa || LONEOS || — || align=right | 1.6 km || 
|-id=628 bgcolor=#E9E9E9
| 86628 ||  || — || March 11, 2000 || Anderson Mesa || LONEOS || — || align=right | 5.2 km || 
|-id=629 bgcolor=#fefefe
| 86629 ||  || — || March 11, 2000 || Anderson Mesa || LONEOS || — || align=right | 4.5 km || 
|-id=630 bgcolor=#fefefe
| 86630 ||  || — || March 11, 2000 || Socorro || LINEAR || — || align=right | 2.0 km || 
|-id=631 bgcolor=#fefefe
| 86631 ||  || — || March 11, 2000 || Socorro || LINEAR || NYS || align=right | 1.5 km || 
|-id=632 bgcolor=#fefefe
| 86632 ||  || — || March 11, 2000 || Socorro || LINEAR || — || align=right | 3.4 km || 
|-id=633 bgcolor=#fefefe
| 86633 ||  || — || March 11, 2000 || Socorro || LINEAR || MAS || align=right | 1.8 km || 
|-id=634 bgcolor=#fefefe
| 86634 ||  || — || March 11, 2000 || Socorro || LINEAR || — || align=right | 1.7 km || 
|-id=635 bgcolor=#fefefe
| 86635 ||  || — || March 11, 2000 || Socorro || LINEAR || — || align=right | 2.0 km || 
|-id=636 bgcolor=#fefefe
| 86636 ||  || — || March 11, 2000 || Anderson Mesa || LONEOS || — || align=right | 2.7 km || 
|-id=637 bgcolor=#fefefe
| 86637 ||  || — || March 11, 2000 || Anderson Mesa || LONEOS || V || align=right | 1.7 km || 
|-id=638 bgcolor=#fefefe
| 86638 ||  || — || March 11, 2000 || Anderson Mesa || LONEOS || NYS || align=right | 1.6 km || 
|-id=639 bgcolor=#fefefe
| 86639 ||  || — || March 11, 2000 || Anderson Mesa || LONEOS || V || align=right | 1.5 km || 
|-id=640 bgcolor=#fefefe
| 86640 ||  || — || March 11, 2000 || Anderson Mesa || LONEOS || — || align=right | 4.1 km || 
|-id=641 bgcolor=#fefefe
| 86641 ||  || — || March 11, 2000 || Socorro || LINEAR || ERI || align=right | 3.7 km || 
|-id=642 bgcolor=#fefefe
| 86642 ||  || — || March 1, 2000 || Catalina || CSS || — || align=right | 3.9 km || 
|-id=643 bgcolor=#fefefe
| 86643 ||  || — || March 2, 2000 || Catalina || CSS || — || align=right | 2.0 km || 
|-id=644 bgcolor=#fefefe
| 86644 ||  || — || March 3, 2000 || Catalina || CSS || — || align=right | 3.0 km || 
|-id=645 bgcolor=#fefefe
| 86645 ||  || — || March 3, 2000 || Socorro || LINEAR || NYS || align=right | 1.4 km || 
|-id=646 bgcolor=#fefefe
| 86646 ||  || — || March 4, 2000 || Catalina || CSS || — || align=right | 2.1 km || 
|-id=647 bgcolor=#fefefe
| 86647 ||  || — || March 5, 2000 || Haleakala || NEAT || — || align=right | 1.7 km || 
|-id=648 bgcolor=#fefefe
| 86648 ||  || — || March 6, 2000 || Haleakala || NEAT || V || align=right | 1.7 km || 
|-id=649 bgcolor=#fefefe
| 86649 ||  || — || March 6, 2000 || Haleakala || NEAT || — || align=right | 2.1 km || 
|-id=650 bgcolor=#fefefe
| 86650 ||  || — || March 6, 2000 || Haleakala || NEAT || FLO || align=right | 1.2 km || 
|-id=651 bgcolor=#fefefe
| 86651 ||  || — || March 6, 2000 || Haleakala || NEAT || — || align=right | 1.8 km || 
|-id=652 bgcolor=#fefefe
| 86652 ||  || — || March 12, 2000 || Anderson Mesa || LONEOS || — || align=right | 5.1 km || 
|-id=653 bgcolor=#fefefe
| 86653 ||  || — || March 5, 2000 || Socorro || LINEAR || V || align=right | 1.4 km || 
|-id=654 bgcolor=#fefefe
| 86654 ||  || — || March 10, 2000 || Socorro || LINEAR || — || align=right | 2.0 km || 
|-id=655 bgcolor=#fefefe
| 86655 ||  || — || March 5, 2000 || Socorro || LINEAR || V || align=right | 1.2 km || 
|-id=656 bgcolor=#fefefe
| 86656 ||  || — || March 5, 2000 || Socorro || LINEAR || — || align=right | 2.0 km || 
|-id=657 bgcolor=#fefefe
| 86657 ||  || — || March 5, 2000 || Haleakala || NEAT || NYS || align=right | 1.5 km || 
|-id=658 bgcolor=#fefefe
| 86658 ||  || — || March 5, 2000 || Haleakala || NEAT || — || align=right | 1.9 km || 
|-id=659 bgcolor=#E9E9E9
| 86659 ||  || — || March 1, 2000 || Kitt Peak || Spacewatch || — || align=right | 2.5 km || 
|-id=660 bgcolor=#fefefe
| 86660 ||  || — || March 1, 2000 || Catalina || CSS || FLO || align=right | 1.9 km || 
|-id=661 bgcolor=#fefefe
| 86661 ||  || — || March 28, 2000 || Socorro || LINEAR || — || align=right | 1.8 km || 
|-id=662 bgcolor=#fefefe
| 86662 ||  || — || March 25, 2000 || Kitt Peak || Spacewatch || — || align=right | 1.6 km || 
|-id=663 bgcolor=#fefefe
| 86663 ||  || — || March 27, 2000 || Kitt Peak || Spacewatch || — || align=right | 1.7 km || 
|-id=664 bgcolor=#fefefe
| 86664 ||  || — || March 30, 2000 || Kitt Peak || Spacewatch || MAS || align=right | 1.6 km || 
|-id=665 bgcolor=#fefefe
| 86665 ||  || — || March 30, 2000 || Kitt Peak || Spacewatch || FLO || align=right | 1.5 km || 
|-id=666 bgcolor=#FFC2E0
| 86666 ||  || — || March 30, 2000 || Catalina || CSS || APO +1kmslow || align=right | 1.2 km || 
|-id=667 bgcolor=#FFC2E0
| 86667 ||  || — || March 30, 2000 || Socorro || LINEAR || ATE +1km || align=right data-sort-value="0.75" | 750 m || 
|-id=668 bgcolor=#E9E9E9
| 86668 ||  || — || March 30, 2000 || Socorro || LINEAR || — || align=right | 5.4 km || 
|-id=669 bgcolor=#E9E9E9
| 86669 ||  || — || March 29, 2000 || Socorro || LINEAR || — || align=right | 2.4 km || 
|-id=670 bgcolor=#fefefe
| 86670 ||  || — || March 28, 2000 || Socorro || LINEAR || — || align=right | 1.8 km || 
|-id=671 bgcolor=#E9E9E9
| 86671 ||  || — || March 29, 2000 || Socorro || LINEAR || JUL || align=right | 2.2 km || 
|-id=672 bgcolor=#fefefe
| 86672 ||  || — || March 29, 2000 || Socorro || LINEAR || V || align=right | 1.4 km || 
|-id=673 bgcolor=#fefefe
| 86673 ||  || — || March 29, 2000 || Socorro || LINEAR || — || align=right | 1.9 km || 
|-id=674 bgcolor=#fefefe
| 86674 ||  || — || March 29, 2000 || Socorro || LINEAR || KLI || align=right | 4.1 km || 
|-id=675 bgcolor=#fefefe
| 86675 ||  || — || March 27, 2000 || Anderson Mesa || LONEOS || NYS || align=right | 4.0 km || 
|-id=676 bgcolor=#fefefe
| 86676 ||  || — || March 27, 2000 || Anderson Mesa || LONEOS || — || align=right | 2.6 km || 
|-id=677 bgcolor=#fefefe
| 86677 ||  || — || March 27, 2000 || Anderson Mesa || LONEOS || — || align=right | 1.8 km || 
|-id=678 bgcolor=#fefefe
| 86678 ||  || — || March 27, 2000 || Anderson Mesa || LONEOS || NYS || align=right | 2.2 km || 
|-id=679 bgcolor=#fefefe
| 86679 ||  || — || March 27, 2000 || Anderson Mesa || LONEOS || — || align=right | 1.8 km || 
|-id=680 bgcolor=#E9E9E9
| 86680 ||  || — || March 28, 2000 || Socorro || LINEAR || — || align=right | 4.6 km || 
|-id=681 bgcolor=#fefefe
| 86681 ||  || — || March 29, 2000 || Socorro || LINEAR || V || align=right | 1.5 km || 
|-id=682 bgcolor=#fefefe
| 86682 ||  || — || March 29, 2000 || Socorro || LINEAR || — || align=right | 1.5 km || 
|-id=683 bgcolor=#fefefe
| 86683 ||  || — || March 29, 2000 || Socorro || LINEAR || NYS || align=right | 1.5 km || 
|-id=684 bgcolor=#fefefe
| 86684 ||  || — || March 29, 2000 || Socorro || LINEAR || NYS || align=right | 1.8 km || 
|-id=685 bgcolor=#fefefe
| 86685 ||  || — || March 29, 2000 || Socorro || LINEAR || — || align=right | 1.5 km || 
|-id=686 bgcolor=#fefefe
| 86686 ||  || — || March 29, 2000 || Socorro || LINEAR || — || align=right | 2.1 km || 
|-id=687 bgcolor=#fefefe
| 86687 ||  || — || March 29, 2000 || Socorro || LINEAR || V || align=right | 1.4 km || 
|-id=688 bgcolor=#fefefe
| 86688 ||  || — || March 29, 2000 || Socorro || LINEAR || — || align=right | 1.8 km || 
|-id=689 bgcolor=#fefefe
| 86689 ||  || — || March 29, 2000 || Socorro || LINEAR || V || align=right | 1.4 km || 
|-id=690 bgcolor=#fefefe
| 86690 ||  || — || March 29, 2000 || Socorro || LINEAR || FLO || align=right | 1.3 km || 
|-id=691 bgcolor=#fefefe
| 86691 ||  || — || March 29, 2000 || Socorro || LINEAR || FLO || align=right | 1.8 km || 
|-id=692 bgcolor=#fefefe
| 86692 ||  || — || March 29, 2000 || Socorro || LINEAR || V || align=right | 1.5 km || 
|-id=693 bgcolor=#fefefe
| 86693 ||  || — || March 30, 2000 || Socorro || LINEAR || — || align=right | 2.1 km || 
|-id=694 bgcolor=#fefefe
| 86694 ||  || — || March 30, 2000 || Socorro || LINEAR || — || align=right | 3.4 km || 
|-id=695 bgcolor=#fefefe
| 86695 ||  || — || March 30, 2000 || Socorro || LINEAR || — || align=right | 1.8 km || 
|-id=696 bgcolor=#fefefe
| 86696 ||  || — || March 30, 2000 || Socorro || LINEAR || FLO || align=right | 2.2 km || 
|-id=697 bgcolor=#fefefe
| 86697 ||  || — || March 30, 2000 || Socorro || LINEAR || NYS || align=right | 7.4 km || 
|-id=698 bgcolor=#fefefe
| 86698 ||  || — || March 30, 2000 || Catalina || CSS || FLO || align=right | 1.5 km || 
|-id=699 bgcolor=#fefefe
| 86699 ||  || — || March 27, 2000 || Anderson Mesa || LONEOS || PHO || align=right | 2.8 km || 
|-id=700 bgcolor=#fefefe
| 86700 ||  || — || March 26, 2000 || Anderson Mesa || LONEOS || — || align=right | 3.8 km || 
|}

86701–86800 

|-bgcolor=#fefefe
| 86701 ||  || — || March 29, 2000 || Socorro || LINEAR || — || align=right | 1.4 km || 
|-id=702 bgcolor=#fefefe
| 86702 ||  || — || March 29, 2000 || Socorro || LINEAR || — || align=right | 1.6 km || 
|-id=703 bgcolor=#fefefe
| 86703 ||  || — || March 29, 2000 || Socorro || LINEAR || — || align=right | 4.4 km || 
|-id=704 bgcolor=#fefefe
| 86704 ||  || — || March 29, 2000 || Socorro || LINEAR || NYS || align=right | 1.1 km || 
|-id=705 bgcolor=#fefefe
| 86705 ||  || — || March 30, 2000 || Socorro || LINEAR || V || align=right | 2.0 km || 
|-id=706 bgcolor=#fefefe
| 86706 ||  || — || March 29, 2000 || Socorro || LINEAR || PHO || align=right | 3.1 km || 
|-id=707 bgcolor=#fefefe
| 86707 || 2000 GJ || — || April 2, 2000 || Prescott || P. G. Comba || NYS || align=right | 1.2 km || 
|-id=708 bgcolor=#fefefe
| 86708 ||  || — || April 4, 2000 || Socorro || LINEAR || FLO || align=right | 1.2 km || 
|-id=709 bgcolor=#fefefe
| 86709 ||  || — || April 4, 2000 || Socorro || LINEAR || FLO || align=right | 1.9 km || 
|-id=710 bgcolor=#fefefe
| 86710 ||  || — || April 4, 2000 || Socorro || LINEAR || NYS || align=right | 1.5 km || 
|-id=711 bgcolor=#fefefe
| 86711 ||  || — || April 4, 2000 || Socorro || LINEAR || NYS || align=right | 1.1 km || 
|-id=712 bgcolor=#fefefe
| 86712 ||  || — || April 4, 2000 || Socorro || LINEAR || MAS || align=right | 1.2 km || 
|-id=713 bgcolor=#fefefe
| 86713 ||  || — || April 5, 2000 || Socorro || LINEAR || — || align=right | 1.8 km || 
|-id=714 bgcolor=#fefefe
| 86714 ||  || — || April 5, 2000 || Socorro || LINEAR || — || align=right | 2.8 km || 
|-id=715 bgcolor=#fefefe
| 86715 ||  || — || April 5, 2000 || Socorro || LINEAR || — || align=right | 1.5 km || 
|-id=716 bgcolor=#fefefe
| 86716 ||  || — || April 5, 2000 || Socorro || LINEAR || — || align=right | 1.7 km || 
|-id=717 bgcolor=#fefefe
| 86717 ||  || — || April 5, 2000 || Socorro || LINEAR || NYS || align=right | 1.4 km || 
|-id=718 bgcolor=#fefefe
| 86718 ||  || — || April 5, 2000 || Socorro || LINEAR || FLO || align=right | 1.2 km || 
|-id=719 bgcolor=#fefefe
| 86719 ||  || — || April 5, 2000 || Socorro || LINEAR || NYS || align=right | 1.2 km || 
|-id=720 bgcolor=#fefefe
| 86720 ||  || — || April 5, 2000 || Socorro || LINEAR || — || align=right | 1.5 km || 
|-id=721 bgcolor=#fefefe
| 86721 ||  || — || April 5, 2000 || Socorro || LINEAR || NYS || align=right | 1.4 km || 
|-id=722 bgcolor=#fefefe
| 86722 ||  || — || April 5, 2000 || Socorro || LINEAR || — || align=right | 1.5 km || 
|-id=723 bgcolor=#fefefe
| 86723 ||  || — || April 5, 2000 || Socorro || LINEAR || — || align=right | 1.3 km || 
|-id=724 bgcolor=#fefefe
| 86724 ||  || — || April 5, 2000 || Socorro || LINEAR || MAS || align=right | 1.6 km || 
|-id=725 bgcolor=#E9E9E9
| 86725 ||  || — || April 5, 2000 || Socorro || LINEAR || AST || align=right | 4.2 km || 
|-id=726 bgcolor=#fefefe
| 86726 ||  || — || April 5, 2000 || Socorro || LINEAR || — || align=right | 2.1 km || 
|-id=727 bgcolor=#fefefe
| 86727 ||  || — || April 5, 2000 || Socorro || LINEAR || NYS || align=right | 1.2 km || 
|-id=728 bgcolor=#fefefe
| 86728 ||  || — || April 5, 2000 || Socorro || LINEAR || FLO || align=right | 1.8 km || 
|-id=729 bgcolor=#fefefe
| 86729 ||  || — || April 5, 2000 || Socorro || LINEAR || NYS || align=right | 3.7 km || 
|-id=730 bgcolor=#FA8072
| 86730 ||  || — || April 5, 2000 || Socorro || LINEAR || — || align=right | 1.5 km || 
|-id=731 bgcolor=#fefefe
| 86731 ||  || — || April 5, 2000 || Socorro || LINEAR || NYS || align=right | 1.7 km || 
|-id=732 bgcolor=#fefefe
| 86732 ||  || — || April 5, 2000 || Socorro || LINEAR || NYS || align=right | 1.2 km || 
|-id=733 bgcolor=#fefefe
| 86733 ||  || — || April 5, 2000 || Socorro || LINEAR || — || align=right | 1.6 km || 
|-id=734 bgcolor=#fefefe
| 86734 ||  || — || April 5, 2000 || Socorro || LINEAR || — || align=right | 1.2 km || 
|-id=735 bgcolor=#fefefe
| 86735 ||  || — || April 5, 2000 || Socorro || LINEAR || MAS || align=right | 1.4 km || 
|-id=736 bgcolor=#fefefe
| 86736 ||  || — || April 5, 2000 || Socorro || LINEAR || NYS || align=right | 1.7 km || 
|-id=737 bgcolor=#fefefe
| 86737 ||  || — || April 5, 2000 || Socorro || LINEAR || NYS || align=right | 1.6 km || 
|-id=738 bgcolor=#fefefe
| 86738 ||  || — || April 5, 2000 || Socorro || LINEAR || — || align=right | 1.5 km || 
|-id=739 bgcolor=#fefefe
| 86739 ||  || — || April 5, 2000 || Socorro || LINEAR || FLO || align=right | 1.8 km || 
|-id=740 bgcolor=#fefefe
| 86740 ||  || — || April 5, 2000 || Socorro || LINEAR || — || align=right | 3.4 km || 
|-id=741 bgcolor=#fefefe
| 86741 ||  || — || April 5, 2000 || Socorro || LINEAR || — || align=right | 2.1 km || 
|-id=742 bgcolor=#fefefe
| 86742 ||  || — || April 5, 2000 || Socorro || LINEAR || MAS || align=right | 2.0 km || 
|-id=743 bgcolor=#fefefe
| 86743 ||  || — || April 5, 2000 || Socorro || LINEAR || — || align=right | 1.8 km || 
|-id=744 bgcolor=#fefefe
| 86744 ||  || — || April 5, 2000 || Socorro || LINEAR || — || align=right | 2.0 km || 
|-id=745 bgcolor=#fefefe
| 86745 ||  || — || April 5, 2000 || Socorro || LINEAR || FLO || align=right | 2.6 km || 
|-id=746 bgcolor=#fefefe
| 86746 ||  || — || April 5, 2000 || Socorro || LINEAR || NYS || align=right | 1.1 km || 
|-id=747 bgcolor=#fefefe
| 86747 ||  || — || April 5, 2000 || Socorro || LINEAR || NYS || align=right | 1.7 km || 
|-id=748 bgcolor=#fefefe
| 86748 ||  || — || April 5, 2000 || Socorro || LINEAR || NYS || align=right | 1.5 km || 
|-id=749 bgcolor=#fefefe
| 86749 ||  || — || April 5, 2000 || Socorro || LINEAR || V || align=right | 1.2 km || 
|-id=750 bgcolor=#fefefe
| 86750 ||  || — || April 5, 2000 || Socorro || LINEAR || — || align=right | 1.2 km || 
|-id=751 bgcolor=#fefefe
| 86751 ||  || — || April 5, 2000 || Socorro || LINEAR || — || align=right | 1.9 km || 
|-id=752 bgcolor=#fefefe
| 86752 ||  || — || April 5, 2000 || Socorro || LINEAR || MAS || align=right | 1.6 km || 
|-id=753 bgcolor=#fefefe
| 86753 ||  || — || April 5, 2000 || Socorro || LINEAR || NYS || align=right | 1.2 km || 
|-id=754 bgcolor=#fefefe
| 86754 ||  || — || April 5, 2000 || Socorro || LINEAR || — || align=right | 1.6 km || 
|-id=755 bgcolor=#fefefe
| 86755 ||  || — || April 5, 2000 || Socorro || LINEAR || FLO || align=right | 1.1 km || 
|-id=756 bgcolor=#fefefe
| 86756 ||  || — || April 5, 2000 || Socorro || LINEAR || V || align=right | 1.9 km || 
|-id=757 bgcolor=#fefefe
| 86757 ||  || — || April 5, 2000 || Socorro || LINEAR || ERI || align=right | 3.8 km || 
|-id=758 bgcolor=#fefefe
| 86758 ||  || — || April 5, 2000 || Socorro || LINEAR || — || align=right | 2.1 km || 
|-id=759 bgcolor=#fefefe
| 86759 ||  || — || April 5, 2000 || Socorro || LINEAR || NYS || align=right | 1.7 km || 
|-id=760 bgcolor=#fefefe
| 86760 ||  || — || April 5, 2000 || Socorro || LINEAR || — || align=right | 1.5 km || 
|-id=761 bgcolor=#E9E9E9
| 86761 ||  || — || April 5, 2000 || Socorro || LINEAR || — || align=right | 1.8 km || 
|-id=762 bgcolor=#fefefe
| 86762 ||  || — || April 5, 2000 || Socorro || LINEAR || — || align=right | 1.4 km || 
|-id=763 bgcolor=#E9E9E9
| 86763 ||  || — || April 5, 2000 || Socorro || LINEAR || — || align=right | 1.8 km || 
|-id=764 bgcolor=#fefefe
| 86764 ||  || — || April 5, 2000 || Socorro || LINEAR || FLO || align=right | 1.2 km || 
|-id=765 bgcolor=#fefefe
| 86765 ||  || — || April 3, 2000 || Socorro || LINEAR || V || align=right | 1.6 km || 
|-id=766 bgcolor=#fefefe
| 86766 ||  || — || April 3, 2000 || Socorro || LINEAR || — || align=right | 1.6 km || 
|-id=767 bgcolor=#fefefe
| 86767 ||  || — || April 3, 2000 || Socorro || LINEAR || — || align=right | 2.1 km || 
|-id=768 bgcolor=#fefefe
| 86768 ||  || — || April 4, 2000 || Socorro || LINEAR || FLO || align=right | 1.8 km || 
|-id=769 bgcolor=#fefefe
| 86769 ||  || — || April 4, 2000 || Socorro || LINEAR || — || align=right | 2.8 km || 
|-id=770 bgcolor=#fefefe
| 86770 ||  || — || April 4, 2000 || Socorro || LINEAR || FLO || align=right | 1.7 km || 
|-id=771 bgcolor=#fefefe
| 86771 ||  || — || April 4, 2000 || Socorro || LINEAR || FLO || align=right | 1.9 km || 
|-id=772 bgcolor=#fefefe
| 86772 ||  || — || April 4, 2000 || Socorro || LINEAR || — || align=right | 2.0 km || 
|-id=773 bgcolor=#fefefe
| 86773 ||  || — || April 4, 2000 || Socorro || LINEAR || — || align=right | 2.3 km || 
|-id=774 bgcolor=#fefefe
| 86774 ||  || — || April 4, 2000 || Socorro || LINEAR || — || align=right | 2.1 km || 
|-id=775 bgcolor=#fefefe
| 86775 ||  || — || April 4, 2000 || Socorro || LINEAR || V || align=right | 2.1 km || 
|-id=776 bgcolor=#fefefe
| 86776 ||  || — || April 4, 2000 || Socorro || LINEAR || — || align=right | 2.2 km || 
|-id=777 bgcolor=#fefefe
| 86777 ||  || — || April 4, 2000 || Socorro || LINEAR || — || align=right | 2.1 km || 
|-id=778 bgcolor=#fefefe
| 86778 ||  || — || April 4, 2000 || Socorro || LINEAR || V || align=right | 2.2 km || 
|-id=779 bgcolor=#fefefe
| 86779 ||  || — || April 4, 2000 || Socorro || LINEAR || — || align=right | 1.3 km || 
|-id=780 bgcolor=#fefefe
| 86780 ||  || — || April 5, 2000 || Socorro || LINEAR || — || align=right | 2.1 km || 
|-id=781 bgcolor=#fefefe
| 86781 ||  || — || April 5, 2000 || Socorro || LINEAR || NYS || align=right | 1.9 km || 
|-id=782 bgcolor=#fefefe
| 86782 ||  || — || April 5, 2000 || Socorro || LINEAR || — || align=right | 1.6 km || 
|-id=783 bgcolor=#fefefe
| 86783 ||  || — || April 5, 2000 || Socorro || LINEAR || — || align=right | 2.1 km || 
|-id=784 bgcolor=#fefefe
| 86784 ||  || — || April 5, 2000 || Socorro || LINEAR || — || align=right | 1.7 km || 
|-id=785 bgcolor=#fefefe
| 86785 ||  || — || April 6, 2000 || Socorro || LINEAR || MAS || align=right | 1.3 km || 
|-id=786 bgcolor=#fefefe
| 86786 ||  || — || April 7, 2000 || Socorro || LINEAR || ERI || align=right | 2.8 km || 
|-id=787 bgcolor=#fefefe
| 86787 ||  || — || April 7, 2000 || Socorro || LINEAR || FLO || align=right | 1.9 km || 
|-id=788 bgcolor=#fefefe
| 86788 ||  || — || April 7, 2000 || Socorro || LINEAR || FLO || align=right | 3.3 km || 
|-id=789 bgcolor=#fefefe
| 86789 ||  || — || April 7, 2000 || Socorro || LINEAR || — || align=right | 2.0 km || 
|-id=790 bgcolor=#fefefe
| 86790 ||  || — || April 7, 2000 || Socorro || LINEAR || — || align=right | 1.9 km || 
|-id=791 bgcolor=#fefefe
| 86791 ||  || — || April 7, 2000 || Socorro || LINEAR || V || align=right | 1.3 km || 
|-id=792 bgcolor=#fefefe
| 86792 ||  || — || April 7, 2000 || Socorro || LINEAR || — || align=right | 1.8 km || 
|-id=793 bgcolor=#fefefe
| 86793 ||  || — || April 7, 2000 || Socorro || LINEAR || — || align=right | 2.3 km || 
|-id=794 bgcolor=#fefefe
| 86794 ||  || — || April 7, 2000 || Socorro || LINEAR || — || align=right | 4.0 km || 
|-id=795 bgcolor=#fefefe
| 86795 ||  || — || April 7, 2000 || Socorro || LINEAR || NYS || align=right | 1.3 km || 
|-id=796 bgcolor=#fefefe
| 86796 ||  || — || April 7, 2000 || Socorro || LINEAR || NYS || align=right | 1.7 km || 
|-id=797 bgcolor=#fefefe
| 86797 ||  || — || April 7, 2000 || Socorro || LINEAR || FLO || align=right | 2.6 km || 
|-id=798 bgcolor=#fefefe
| 86798 ||  || — || April 3, 2000 || Anderson Mesa || LONEOS || V || align=right | 1.8 km || 
|-id=799 bgcolor=#fefefe
| 86799 ||  || — || April 3, 2000 || Anderson Mesa || LONEOS || FLO || align=right | 2.1 km || 
|-id=800 bgcolor=#fefefe
| 86800 ||  || — || April 6, 2000 || Socorro || LINEAR || — || align=right | 1.8 km || 
|}

86801–86900 

|-bgcolor=#fefefe
| 86801 ||  || — || April 6, 2000 || Socorro || LINEAR || NYS || align=right | 1.7 km || 
|-id=802 bgcolor=#fefefe
| 86802 ||  || — || April 7, 2000 || Socorro || LINEAR || V || align=right | 1.4 km || 
|-id=803 bgcolor=#fefefe
| 86803 ||  || — || April 8, 2000 || Socorro || LINEAR || V || align=right | 1.6 km || 
|-id=804 bgcolor=#fefefe
| 86804 ||  || — || April 8, 2000 || Socorro || LINEAR || V || align=right | 1.9 km || 
|-id=805 bgcolor=#fefefe
| 86805 ||  || — || April 8, 2000 || Socorro || LINEAR || — || align=right | 1.4 km || 
|-id=806 bgcolor=#fefefe
| 86806 ||  || — || April 8, 2000 || Socorro || LINEAR || NYS || align=right | 3.6 km || 
|-id=807 bgcolor=#fefefe
| 86807 ||  || — || April 8, 2000 || Socorro || LINEAR || NYS || align=right | 1.7 km || 
|-id=808 bgcolor=#fefefe
| 86808 ||  || — || April 2, 2000 || Kitt Peak || Spacewatch || — || align=right | 1.4 km || 
|-id=809 bgcolor=#fefefe
| 86809 ||  || — || April 7, 2000 || Socorro || LINEAR || V || align=right | 1.6 km || 
|-id=810 bgcolor=#fefefe
| 86810 ||  || — || April 7, 2000 || Socorro || LINEAR || — || align=right | 1.6 km || 
|-id=811 bgcolor=#fefefe
| 86811 ||  || — || April 7, 2000 || Socorro || LINEAR || — || align=right | 2.3 km || 
|-id=812 bgcolor=#fefefe
| 86812 ||  || — || April 7, 2000 || Socorro || LINEAR || KLI || align=right | 4.9 km || 
|-id=813 bgcolor=#fefefe
| 86813 ||  || — || April 7, 2000 || Kitt Peak || Spacewatch || V || align=right | 1.3 km || 
|-id=814 bgcolor=#fefefe
| 86814 ||  || — || April 13, 2000 || Prescott || P. G. Comba || — || align=right | 1.5 km || 
|-id=815 bgcolor=#fefefe
| 86815 ||  || — || April 8, 2000 || Socorro || LINEAR || — || align=right | 3.4 km || 
|-id=816 bgcolor=#fefefe
| 86816 ||  || — || April 8, 2000 || Socorro || LINEAR || — || align=right | 2.1 km || 
|-id=817 bgcolor=#fefefe
| 86817 ||  || — || April 12, 2000 || Socorro || LINEAR || — || align=right | 1.4 km || 
|-id=818 bgcolor=#fefefe
| 86818 ||  || — || April 12, 2000 || Socorro || LINEAR || — || align=right | 3.1 km || 
|-id=819 bgcolor=#FFC2E0
| 86819 ||  || — || April 13, 2000 || Socorro || LINEAR || APO +1kmPHA || align=right data-sort-value="0.8" | 800 m || 
|-id=820 bgcolor=#fefefe
| 86820 ||  || — || April 4, 2000 || Anderson Mesa || LONEOS || — || align=right | 1.7 km || 
|-id=821 bgcolor=#fefefe
| 86821 ||  || — || April 4, 2000 || Anderson Mesa || LONEOS || — || align=right | 1.6 km || 
|-id=822 bgcolor=#fefefe
| 86822 ||  || — || April 4, 2000 || Anderson Mesa || LONEOS || — || align=right | 1.6 km || 
|-id=823 bgcolor=#fefefe
| 86823 ||  || — || April 4, 2000 || Anderson Mesa || LONEOS || — || align=right | 2.0 km || 
|-id=824 bgcolor=#fefefe
| 86824 ||  || — || April 4, 2000 || Anderson Mesa || LONEOS || EUT || align=right | 1.3 km || 
|-id=825 bgcolor=#fefefe
| 86825 ||  || — || April 7, 2000 || Anderson Mesa || LONEOS || — || align=right | 1.9 km || 
|-id=826 bgcolor=#E9E9E9
| 86826 ||  || — || April 7, 2000 || Anderson Mesa || LONEOS || — || align=right | 1.8 km || 
|-id=827 bgcolor=#fefefe
| 86827 ||  || — || April 10, 2000 || Kitt Peak || Spacewatch || V || align=right | 1.6 km || 
|-id=828 bgcolor=#fefefe
| 86828 ||  || — || April 11, 2000 || Kitt Peak || Spacewatch || — || align=right | 1.6 km || 
|-id=829 bgcolor=#FFC2E0
| 86829 ||  || — || April 12, 2000 || Socorro || LINEAR || APO +1km || align=right | 1.8 km || 
|-id=830 bgcolor=#fefefe
| 86830 ||  || — || April 2, 2000 || Anderson Mesa || LONEOS || FLO || align=right | 2.3 km || 
|-id=831 bgcolor=#fefefe
| 86831 ||  || — || April 2, 2000 || Kitt Peak || Spacewatch || — || align=right | 3.3 km || 
|-id=832 bgcolor=#fefefe
| 86832 ||  || — || April 6, 2000 || Anderson Mesa || LONEOS || — || align=right | 2.5 km || 
|-id=833 bgcolor=#fefefe
| 86833 ||  || — || April 6, 2000 || Anderson Mesa || LONEOS || — || align=right | 3.3 km || 
|-id=834 bgcolor=#E9E9E9
| 86834 ||  || — || April 6, 2000 || Kitt Peak || Spacewatch || — || align=right | 4.1 km || 
|-id=835 bgcolor=#fefefe
| 86835 ||  || — || April 7, 2000 || Anderson Mesa || LONEOS || — || align=right | 1.6 km || 
|-id=836 bgcolor=#fefefe
| 86836 ||  || — || April 7, 2000 || Socorro || LINEAR || FLO || align=right | 1.1 km || 
|-id=837 bgcolor=#fefefe
| 86837 ||  || — || April 7, 2000 || Socorro || LINEAR || — || align=right | 1.8 km || 
|-id=838 bgcolor=#fefefe
| 86838 ||  || — || April 7, 2000 || Anderson Mesa || LONEOS || — || align=right | 1.9 km || 
|-id=839 bgcolor=#fefefe
| 86839 ||  || — || April 7, 2000 || Anderson Mesa || LONEOS || — || align=right | 1.9 km || 
|-id=840 bgcolor=#fefefe
| 86840 ||  || — || April 7, 2000 || Socorro || LINEAR || V || align=right | 1.8 km || 
|-id=841 bgcolor=#fefefe
| 86841 ||  || — || April 9, 2000 || Anderson Mesa || LONEOS || PHO || align=right | 2.4 km || 
|-id=842 bgcolor=#fefefe
| 86842 ||  || — || April 5, 2000 || Socorro || LINEAR || — || align=right | 2.1 km || 
|-id=843 bgcolor=#fefefe
| 86843 ||  || — || April 4, 2000 || Anderson Mesa || LONEOS || — || align=right | 1.9 km || 
|-id=844 bgcolor=#fefefe
| 86844 ||  || — || April 5, 2000 || Anderson Mesa || LONEOS || — || align=right | 1.8 km || 
|-id=845 bgcolor=#fefefe
| 86845 ||  || — || April 2, 2000 || Anderson Mesa || LONEOS || — || align=right | 1.6 km || 
|-id=846 bgcolor=#fefefe
| 86846 ||  || — || April 3, 2000 || Socorro || LINEAR || V || align=right | 1.3 km || 
|-id=847 bgcolor=#fefefe
| 86847 ||  || — || April 3, 2000 || Kitt Peak || Spacewatch || — || align=right | 1.0 km || 
|-id=848 bgcolor=#fefefe
| 86848 ||  || — || April 2, 2000 || Kitt Peak || Spacewatch || NYS || align=right | 1.6 km || 
|-id=849 bgcolor=#fefefe
| 86849 ||  || — || April 5, 2000 || Anderson Mesa || LONEOS || FLO || align=right | 1.7 km || 
|-id=850 bgcolor=#fefefe
| 86850 ||  || — || April 2, 2000 || Anderson Mesa || LONEOS || NYS || align=right | 3.9 km || 
|-id=851 bgcolor=#fefefe
| 86851 || 2000 HK || — || April 24, 2000 || Kitt Peak || Spacewatch || — || align=right | 1.2 km || 
|-id=852 bgcolor=#fefefe
| 86852 ||  || — || April 25, 2000 || Kitt Peak || Spacewatch || — || align=right | 2.1 km || 
|-id=853 bgcolor=#fefefe
| 86853 ||  || — || April 27, 2000 || Socorro || LINEAR || — || align=right | 2.9 km || 
|-id=854 bgcolor=#fefefe
| 86854 ||  || — || April 28, 2000 || Socorro || LINEAR || — || align=right | 2.3 km || 
|-id=855 bgcolor=#fefefe
| 86855 ||  || — || April 24, 2000 || Kitt Peak || Spacewatch || — || align=right | 1.9 km || 
|-id=856 bgcolor=#fefefe
| 86856 ||  || — || April 27, 2000 || Socorro || LINEAR || — || align=right | 1.6 km || 
|-id=857 bgcolor=#fefefe
| 86857 ||  || — || April 27, 2000 || Socorro || LINEAR || V || align=right | 1.6 km || 
|-id=858 bgcolor=#fefefe
| 86858 ||  || — || April 28, 2000 || Socorro || LINEAR || — || align=right | 1.6 km || 
|-id=859 bgcolor=#fefefe
| 86859 ||  || — || April 28, 2000 || Socorro || LINEAR || V || align=right | 1.7 km || 
|-id=860 bgcolor=#fefefe
| 86860 ||  || — || April 28, 2000 || Socorro || LINEAR || — || align=right | 1.7 km || 
|-id=861 bgcolor=#fefefe
| 86861 ||  || — || April 28, 2000 || Socorro || LINEAR || — || align=right | 1.6 km || 
|-id=862 bgcolor=#E9E9E9
| 86862 ||  || — || April 28, 2000 || Socorro || LINEAR || — || align=right | 1.9 km || 
|-id=863 bgcolor=#fefefe
| 86863 ||  || — || April 27, 2000 || Socorro || LINEAR || FLO || align=right | 1.4 km || 
|-id=864 bgcolor=#fefefe
| 86864 ||  || — || April 29, 2000 || Socorro || LINEAR || FLO || align=right | 1.3 km || 
|-id=865 bgcolor=#fefefe
| 86865 ||  || — || April 24, 2000 || Kitt Peak || Spacewatch || MASfast? || align=right | 1.5 km || 
|-id=866 bgcolor=#fefefe
| 86866 ||  || — || April 24, 2000 || Kitt Peak || Spacewatch || — || align=right | 1.9 km || 
|-id=867 bgcolor=#fefefe
| 86867 ||  || — || April 25, 2000 || Kitt Peak || Spacewatch || V || align=right | 2.0 km || 
|-id=868 bgcolor=#fefefe
| 86868 ||  || — || April 27, 2000 || Kitt Peak || Spacewatch || V || align=right | 1.4 km || 
|-id=869 bgcolor=#fefefe
| 86869 ||  || — || April 29, 2000 || Kitt Peak || Spacewatch || — || align=right | 1.5 km || 
|-id=870 bgcolor=#fefefe
| 86870 ||  || — || April 29, 2000 || Kitt Peak || Spacewatch || V || align=right | 1.2 km || 
|-id=871 bgcolor=#fefefe
| 86871 ||  || — || April 27, 2000 || Socorro || LINEAR || NYS || align=right | 1.4 km || 
|-id=872 bgcolor=#fefefe
| 86872 ||  || — || April 27, 2000 || Socorro || LINEAR || V || align=right | 1.9 km || 
|-id=873 bgcolor=#fefefe
| 86873 ||  || — || April 27, 2000 || Socorro || LINEAR || V || align=right | 2.0 km || 
|-id=874 bgcolor=#fefefe
| 86874 ||  || — || April 27, 2000 || Socorro || LINEAR || FLO || align=right | 1.5 km || 
|-id=875 bgcolor=#fefefe
| 86875 ||  || — || April 28, 2000 || Socorro || LINEAR || V || align=right | 1.8 km || 
|-id=876 bgcolor=#fefefe
| 86876 ||  || — || April 29, 2000 || Socorro || LINEAR || — || align=right | 1.8 km || 
|-id=877 bgcolor=#E9E9E9
| 86877 ||  || — || April 29, 2000 || Socorro || LINEAR || — || align=right | 2.0 km || 
|-id=878 bgcolor=#FFC2E0
| 86878 ||  || — || April 30, 2000 || Haleakala || NEAT || APO +1km || align=right | 1.0 km || 
|-id=879 bgcolor=#fefefe
| 86879 ||  || — || April 24, 2000 || Anderson Mesa || LONEOS || NYS || align=right | 1.4 km || 
|-id=880 bgcolor=#fefefe
| 86880 ||  || — || April 24, 2000 || Anderson Mesa || LONEOS || — || align=right | 1.8 km || 
|-id=881 bgcolor=#fefefe
| 86881 ||  || — || April 27, 2000 || Socorro || LINEAR || V || align=right | 1.6 km || 
|-id=882 bgcolor=#fefefe
| 86882 ||  || — || April 27, 2000 || Socorro || LINEAR || — || align=right | 1.8 km || 
|-id=883 bgcolor=#fefefe
| 86883 ||  || — || April 27, 2000 || Socorro || LINEAR || — || align=right | 5.6 km || 
|-id=884 bgcolor=#fefefe
| 86884 ||  || — || April 27, 2000 || Socorro || LINEAR || — || align=right | 2.5 km || 
|-id=885 bgcolor=#fefefe
| 86885 ||  || — || April 28, 2000 || Socorro || LINEAR || PHO || align=right | 3.5 km || 
|-id=886 bgcolor=#fefefe
| 86886 ||  || — || April 28, 2000 || Socorro || LINEAR || V || align=right | 1.9 km || 
|-id=887 bgcolor=#fefefe
| 86887 ||  || — || April 28, 2000 || Socorro || LINEAR || V || align=right | 1.4 km || 
|-id=888 bgcolor=#fefefe
| 86888 ||  || — || April 28, 2000 || Socorro || LINEAR || — || align=right | 1.9 km || 
|-id=889 bgcolor=#fefefe
| 86889 ||  || — || April 28, 2000 || Socorro || LINEAR || — || align=right | 1.9 km || 
|-id=890 bgcolor=#fefefe
| 86890 ||  || — || April 29, 2000 || Socorro || LINEAR || — || align=right | 1.8 km || 
|-id=891 bgcolor=#fefefe
| 86891 ||  || — || April 29, 2000 || Socorro || LINEAR || — || align=right | 1.6 km || 
|-id=892 bgcolor=#fefefe
| 86892 ||  || — || April 29, 2000 || Socorro || LINEAR || — || align=right | 1.6 km || 
|-id=893 bgcolor=#E9E9E9
| 86893 ||  || — || April 29, 2000 || Socorro || LINEAR || — || align=right | 2.4 km || 
|-id=894 bgcolor=#fefefe
| 86894 ||  || — || April 25, 2000 || Anderson Mesa || LONEOS || FLO || align=right | 2.6 km || 
|-id=895 bgcolor=#fefefe
| 86895 ||  || — || April 25, 2000 || Kvistaberg || UDAS || — || align=right | 2.2 km || 
|-id=896 bgcolor=#fefefe
| 86896 ||  || — || April 29, 2000 || Socorro || LINEAR || — || align=right | 2.2 km || 
|-id=897 bgcolor=#fefefe
| 86897 ||  || — || April 29, 2000 || Kitt Peak || Spacewatch || V || align=right | 1.5 km || 
|-id=898 bgcolor=#fefefe
| 86898 ||  || — || April 30, 2000 || Kitt Peak || Spacewatch || NYS || align=right | 1.7 km || 
|-id=899 bgcolor=#fefefe
| 86899 ||  || — || April 28, 2000 || Socorro || LINEAR || V || align=right | 1.8 km || 
|-id=900 bgcolor=#fefefe
| 86900 ||  || — || April 29, 2000 || Socorro || LINEAR || — || align=right | 2.1 km || 
|}

86901–87000 

|-bgcolor=#fefefe
| 86901 ||  || — || April 26, 2000 || Anderson Mesa || LONEOS || FLO || align=right | 1.5 km || 
|-id=902 bgcolor=#fefefe
| 86902 ||  || — || April 26, 2000 || Anderson Mesa || LONEOS || NYS || align=right | 2.2 km || 
|-id=903 bgcolor=#fefefe
| 86903 ||  || — || April 29, 2000 || Socorro || LINEAR || V || align=right | 1.4 km || 
|-id=904 bgcolor=#E9E9E9
| 86904 ||  || — || April 29, 2000 || Socorro || LINEAR || GEF || align=right | 3.3 km || 
|-id=905 bgcolor=#d6d6d6
| 86905 ||  || — || April 29, 2000 || Socorro || LINEAR || — || align=right | 6.7 km || 
|-id=906 bgcolor=#d6d6d6
| 86906 ||  || — || April 29, 2000 || Socorro || LINEAR || — || align=right | 3.9 km || 
|-id=907 bgcolor=#fefefe
| 86907 ||  || — || April 29, 2000 || Socorro || LINEAR || NYS || align=right | 1.8 km || 
|-id=908 bgcolor=#E9E9E9
| 86908 ||  || — || April 29, 2000 || Socorro || LINEAR || — || align=right | 1.9 km || 
|-id=909 bgcolor=#fefefe
| 86909 ||  || — || April 29, 2000 || Socorro || LINEAR || — || align=right | 4.8 km || 
|-id=910 bgcolor=#fefefe
| 86910 ||  || — || April 29, 2000 || Socorro || LINEAR || V || align=right | 1.4 km || 
|-id=911 bgcolor=#fefefe
| 86911 ||  || — || April 29, 2000 || Socorro || LINEAR || FLO || align=right | 1.7 km || 
|-id=912 bgcolor=#fefefe
| 86912 ||  || — || April 29, 2000 || Socorro || LINEAR || MAS || align=right | 2.0 km || 
|-id=913 bgcolor=#fefefe
| 86913 ||  || — || April 29, 2000 || Socorro || LINEAR || — || align=right | 1.8 km || 
|-id=914 bgcolor=#fefefe
| 86914 ||  || — || April 29, 2000 || Socorro || LINEAR || — || align=right | 1.8 km || 
|-id=915 bgcolor=#fefefe
| 86915 ||  || — || April 29, 2000 || Socorro || LINEAR || V || align=right | 1.3 km || 
|-id=916 bgcolor=#fefefe
| 86916 ||  || — || April 29, 2000 || Socorro || LINEAR || — || align=right | 1.8 km || 
|-id=917 bgcolor=#fefefe
| 86917 ||  || — || April 29, 2000 || Socorro || LINEAR || V || align=right | 1.9 km || 
|-id=918 bgcolor=#fefefe
| 86918 ||  || — || April 29, 2000 || Socorro || LINEAR || NYS || align=right | 1.3 km || 
|-id=919 bgcolor=#E9E9E9
| 86919 ||  || — || April 24, 2000 || Anderson Mesa || LONEOS || — || align=right | 3.1 km || 
|-id=920 bgcolor=#fefefe
| 86920 ||  || — || April 24, 2000 || Anderson Mesa || LONEOS || — || align=right | 2.0 km || 
|-id=921 bgcolor=#fefefe
| 86921 ||  || — || April 24, 2000 || Anderson Mesa || LONEOS || — || align=right | 2.0 km || 
|-id=922 bgcolor=#fefefe
| 86922 ||  || — || April 24, 2000 || Anderson Mesa || LONEOS || FLO || align=right | 2.1 km || 
|-id=923 bgcolor=#fefefe
| 86923 ||  || — || April 25, 2000 || Anderson Mesa || LONEOS || — || align=right | 2.1 km || 
|-id=924 bgcolor=#E9E9E9
| 86924 ||  || — || April 25, 2000 || Anderson Mesa || LONEOS || — || align=right | 2.0 km || 
|-id=925 bgcolor=#E9E9E9
| 86925 ||  || — || April 25, 2000 || Anderson Mesa || LONEOS || — || align=right | 2.3 km || 
|-id=926 bgcolor=#fefefe
| 86926 ||  || — || April 25, 2000 || Anderson Mesa || LONEOS || — || align=right | 1.9 km || 
|-id=927 bgcolor=#fefefe
| 86927 ||  || — || April 25, 2000 || Anderson Mesa || LONEOS || FLO || align=right | 2.5 km || 
|-id=928 bgcolor=#E9E9E9
| 86928 ||  || — || April 25, 2000 || Kitt Peak || Spacewatch || — || align=right | 1.8 km || 
|-id=929 bgcolor=#fefefe
| 86929 ||  || — || April 26, 2000 || Anderson Mesa || LONEOS || — || align=right | 1.3 km || 
|-id=930 bgcolor=#fefefe
| 86930 ||  || — || April 26, 2000 || Anderson Mesa || LONEOS || NYS || align=right | 1.3 km || 
|-id=931 bgcolor=#fefefe
| 86931 ||  || — || April 26, 2000 || Anderson Mesa || LONEOS || FLO || align=right | 2.4 km || 
|-id=932 bgcolor=#fefefe
| 86932 ||  || — || April 26, 2000 || Anderson Mesa || LONEOS || ERI || align=right | 2.9 km || 
|-id=933 bgcolor=#E9E9E9
| 86933 ||  || — || April 26, 2000 || Anderson Mesa || LONEOS || — || align=right | 2.6 km || 
|-id=934 bgcolor=#fefefe
| 86934 ||  || — || April 27, 2000 || Anderson Mesa || LONEOS || — || align=right | 1.5 km || 
|-id=935 bgcolor=#fefefe
| 86935 ||  || — || April 25, 2000 || Anderson Mesa || LONEOS || NYS || align=right | 1.5 km || 
|-id=936 bgcolor=#fefefe
| 86936 ||  || — || April 26, 2000 || Anderson Mesa || LONEOS || FLO || align=right | 2.1 km || 
|-id=937 bgcolor=#fefefe
| 86937 ||  || — || April 26, 2000 || Anderson Mesa || LONEOS || FLO || align=right | 1.5 km || 
|-id=938 bgcolor=#fefefe
| 86938 ||  || — || April 26, 2000 || Anderson Mesa || LONEOS || NYS || align=right | 1.3 km || 
|-id=939 bgcolor=#fefefe
| 86939 ||  || — || April 26, 2000 || Anderson Mesa || LONEOS || — || align=right | 2.1 km || 
|-id=940 bgcolor=#fefefe
| 86940 ||  || — || April 24, 2000 || Anderson Mesa || LONEOS || — || align=right | 2.0 km || 
|-id=941 bgcolor=#fefefe
| 86941 ||  || — || April 25, 2000 || Anderson Mesa || LONEOS || — || align=right | 2.6 km || 
|-id=942 bgcolor=#fefefe
| 86942 ||  || — || April 25, 2000 || Anderson Mesa || LONEOS || NYS || align=right | 1.3 km || 
|-id=943 bgcolor=#fefefe
| 86943 ||  || — || April 27, 2000 || Socorro || LINEAR || NYS || align=right | 3.0 km || 
|-id=944 bgcolor=#fefefe
| 86944 ||  || — || April 29, 2000 || Anderson Mesa || LONEOS || PHO || align=right | 2.0 km || 
|-id=945 bgcolor=#fefefe
| 86945 ||  || — || April 29, 2000 || Kitt Peak || Spacewatch || — || align=right | 3.0 km || 
|-id=946 bgcolor=#fefefe
| 86946 ||  || — || April 29, 2000 || Kitt Peak || Spacewatch || — || align=right | 3.2 km || 
|-id=947 bgcolor=#fefefe
| 86947 ||  || — || April 30, 2000 || Anderson Mesa || LONEOS || V || align=right | 1.2 km || 
|-id=948 bgcolor=#fefefe
| 86948 ||  || — || April 30, 2000 || Anderson Mesa || LONEOS || FLO || align=right | 1.6 km || 
|-id=949 bgcolor=#fefefe
| 86949 ||  || — || April 30, 2000 || Kitt Peak || Spacewatch || V || align=right | 1.4 km || 
|-id=950 bgcolor=#fefefe
| 86950 ||  || — || April 27, 2000 || Socorro || LINEAR || — || align=right | 1.6 km || 
|-id=951 bgcolor=#fefefe
| 86951 ||  || — || April 27, 2000 || Socorro || LINEAR || FLO || align=right | 1.3 km || 
|-id=952 bgcolor=#fefefe
| 86952 ||  || — || April 29, 2000 || Socorro || LINEAR || — || align=right | 1.9 km || 
|-id=953 bgcolor=#fefefe
| 86953 ||  || — || April 30, 2000 || Anderson Mesa || LONEOS || — || align=right | 1.5 km || 
|-id=954 bgcolor=#fefefe
| 86954 ||  || — || April 28, 2000 || Anderson Mesa || LONEOS || V || align=right | 1.3 km || 
|-id=955 bgcolor=#fefefe
| 86955 ||  || — || April 28, 2000 || Anderson Mesa || LONEOS || — || align=right | 1.8 km || 
|-id=956 bgcolor=#fefefe
| 86956 ||  || — || April 27, 2000 || Socorro || LINEAR || — || align=right | 2.2 km || 
|-id=957 bgcolor=#E9E9E9
| 86957 ||  || — || April 25, 2000 || Anderson Mesa || LONEOS || — || align=right | 1.5 km || 
|-id=958 bgcolor=#fefefe
| 86958 || 2000 JQ || — || May 1, 2000 || Socorro || LINEAR || — || align=right | 1.7 km || 
|-id=959 bgcolor=#fefefe
| 86959 ||  || — || May 2, 2000 || Socorro || LINEAR || PHO || align=right | 2.5 km || 
|-id=960 bgcolor=#fefefe
| 86960 ||  || — || May 1, 2000 || Socorro || LINEAR || — || align=right | 1.6 km || 
|-id=961 bgcolor=#fefefe
| 86961 ||  || — || May 1, 2000 || Socorro || LINEAR || FLO || align=right | 1.7 km || 
|-id=962 bgcolor=#fefefe
| 86962 ||  || — || May 3, 2000 || Socorro || LINEAR || PHO || align=right | 1.9 km || 
|-id=963 bgcolor=#fefefe
| 86963 ||  || — || May 1, 2000 || Socorro || LINEAR || V || align=right | 1.1 km || 
|-id=964 bgcolor=#FA8072
| 86964 ||  || — || May 3, 2000 || Socorro || LINEAR || — || align=right | 1.9 km || 
|-id=965 bgcolor=#E9E9E9
| 86965 ||  || — || May 2, 2000 || Socorro || LINEAR || — || align=right | 3.5 km || 
|-id=966 bgcolor=#E9E9E9
| 86966 ||  || — || May 6, 2000 || Socorro || LINEAR || — || align=right | 5.6 km || 
|-id=967 bgcolor=#fefefe
| 86967 ||  || — || May 1, 2000 || Socorro || LINEAR || — || align=right | 1.5 km || 
|-id=968 bgcolor=#E9E9E9
| 86968 ||  || — || May 2, 2000 || Socorro || LINEAR || — || align=right | 2.0 km || 
|-id=969 bgcolor=#fefefe
| 86969 ||  || — || May 3, 2000 || Socorro || LINEAR || — || align=right | 3.5 km || 
|-id=970 bgcolor=#fefefe
| 86970 ||  || — || May 5, 2000 || Socorro || LINEAR || FLO || align=right | 1.6 km || 
|-id=971 bgcolor=#fefefe
| 86971 ||  || — || May 6, 2000 || Socorro || LINEAR || EUT || align=right | 1.3 km || 
|-id=972 bgcolor=#fefefe
| 86972 ||  || — || May 6, 2000 || Socorro || LINEAR || — || align=right | 2.0 km || 
|-id=973 bgcolor=#fefefe
| 86973 ||  || — || May 6, 2000 || Socorro || LINEAR || — || align=right | 2.0 km || 
|-id=974 bgcolor=#fefefe
| 86974 ||  || — || May 6, 2000 || Socorro || LINEAR || — || align=right | 1.8 km || 
|-id=975 bgcolor=#fefefe
| 86975 ||  || — || May 5, 2000 || Socorro || LINEAR || — || align=right | 1.5 km || 
|-id=976 bgcolor=#fefefe
| 86976 ||  || — || May 5, 2000 || Socorro || LINEAR || — || align=right | 1.8 km || 
|-id=977 bgcolor=#fefefe
| 86977 ||  || — || May 6, 2000 || Socorro || LINEAR || — || align=right | 1.6 km || 
|-id=978 bgcolor=#E9E9E9
| 86978 ||  || — || May 3, 2000 || Socorro || LINEAR || — || align=right | 2.3 km || 
|-id=979 bgcolor=#fefefe
| 86979 ||  || — || May 6, 2000 || Socorro || LINEAR || V || align=right | 1.8 km || 
|-id=980 bgcolor=#fefefe
| 86980 ||  || — || May 7, 2000 || Socorro || LINEAR || NYS || align=right | 1.4 km || 
|-id=981 bgcolor=#fefefe
| 86981 ||  || — || May 7, 2000 || Socorro || LINEAR || V || align=right | 1.9 km || 
|-id=982 bgcolor=#fefefe
| 86982 ||  || — || May 7, 2000 || Socorro || LINEAR || — || align=right | 2.6 km || 
|-id=983 bgcolor=#fefefe
| 86983 ||  || — || May 7, 2000 || Socorro || LINEAR || — || align=right | 2.2 km || 
|-id=984 bgcolor=#fefefe
| 86984 ||  || — || May 7, 2000 || Socorro || LINEAR || — || align=right | 2.0 km || 
|-id=985 bgcolor=#fefefe
| 86985 ||  || — || May 7, 2000 || Socorro || LINEAR || — || align=right | 2.1 km || 
|-id=986 bgcolor=#fefefe
| 86986 ||  || — || May 7, 2000 || Socorro || LINEAR || — || align=right | 2.0 km || 
|-id=987 bgcolor=#fefefe
| 86987 ||  || — || May 7, 2000 || Socorro || LINEAR || FLO || align=right | 1.4 km || 
|-id=988 bgcolor=#E9E9E9
| 86988 ||  || — || May 7, 2000 || Socorro || LINEAR || — || align=right | 2.4 km || 
|-id=989 bgcolor=#fefefe
| 86989 ||  || — || May 7, 2000 || Socorro || LINEAR || — || align=right | 3.7 km || 
|-id=990 bgcolor=#fefefe
| 86990 ||  || — || May 7, 2000 || Socorro || LINEAR || — || align=right | 2.2 km || 
|-id=991 bgcolor=#fefefe
| 86991 ||  || — || May 7, 2000 || Socorro || LINEAR || — || align=right | 1.8 km || 
|-id=992 bgcolor=#fefefe
| 86992 ||  || — || May 7, 2000 || Socorro || LINEAR || FLO || align=right | 1.7 km || 
|-id=993 bgcolor=#fefefe
| 86993 ||  || — || May 7, 2000 || Socorro || LINEAR || — || align=right | 2.0 km || 
|-id=994 bgcolor=#fefefe
| 86994 ||  || — || May 7, 2000 || Socorro || LINEAR || NYS || align=right | 1.5 km || 
|-id=995 bgcolor=#fefefe
| 86995 ||  || — || May 7, 2000 || Socorro || LINEAR || NYS || align=right | 2.0 km || 
|-id=996 bgcolor=#E9E9E9
| 86996 ||  || — || May 7, 2000 || Socorro || LINEAR || — || align=right | 2.1 km || 
|-id=997 bgcolor=#fefefe
| 86997 ||  || — || May 7, 2000 || Socorro || LINEAR || NYS || align=right | 1.5 km || 
|-id=998 bgcolor=#fefefe
| 86998 ||  || — || May 7, 2000 || Socorro || LINEAR || FLO || align=right | 2.3 km || 
|-id=999 bgcolor=#E9E9E9
| 86999 ||  || — || May 7, 2000 || Socorro || LINEAR || — || align=right | 1.6 km || 
|-id=000 bgcolor=#E9E9E9
| 87000 ||  || — || May 7, 2000 || Socorro || LINEAR || — || align=right | 2.7 km || 
|}

References

External links 
 Discovery Circumstances: Numbered Minor Planets (85001)–(90000) (IAU Minor Planet Center)

0086